

310001–310100 

|-bgcolor=#E9E9E9
| 310001 ||  || — || May 14, 2009 || Siding Spring || SSS || — || align=right | 2.5 km || 
|-id=002 bgcolor=#E9E9E9
| 310002 ||  || — || May 1, 2009 || Cerro Burek || Alianza S4 Obs. || — || align=right | 1.1 km || 
|-id=003 bgcolor=#d6d6d6
| 310003 ||  || — || May 1, 2009 || Kitt Peak || Spacewatch || — || align=right | 4.6 km || 
|-id=004 bgcolor=#E9E9E9
| 310004 ||  || — || May 15, 2009 || Kitt Peak || Spacewatch || — || align=right | 2.1 km || 
|-id=005 bgcolor=#C2FFFF
| 310005 || 2009 KE || — || May 16, 2009 || Mount Lemmon || Mount Lemmon Survey || L4 || align=right | 20 km || 
|-id=006 bgcolor=#d6d6d6
| 310006 ||  || — || May 17, 2009 || La Sagra || OAM Obs. || LUT || align=right | 5.1 km || 
|-id=007 bgcolor=#E9E9E9
| 310007 ||  || — || May 24, 2009 || La Sagra || OAM Obs. || — || align=right | 2.6 km || 
|-id=008 bgcolor=#E9E9E9
| 310008 ||  || — || May 17, 2009 || Kitt Peak || Spacewatch || — || align=right | 3.1 km || 
|-id=009 bgcolor=#E9E9E9
| 310009 ||  || — || May 24, 2009 || Catalina || CSS || — || align=right | 2.2 km || 
|-id=010 bgcolor=#d6d6d6
| 310010 ||  || — || May 25, 2009 || Kitt Peak || Spacewatch || — || align=right | 3.3 km || 
|-id=011 bgcolor=#d6d6d6
| 310011 ||  || — || May 24, 2009 || Kitt Peak || Spacewatch || — || align=right | 4.0 km || 
|-id=012 bgcolor=#d6d6d6
| 310012 ||  || — || May 26, 2009 || Kitt Peak || Spacewatch || EOS || align=right | 2.0 km || 
|-id=013 bgcolor=#d6d6d6
| 310013 ||  || — || May 26, 2009 || Kitt Peak || Spacewatch || — || align=right | 3.4 km || 
|-id=014 bgcolor=#E9E9E9
| 310014 ||  || — || May 27, 2009 || Kitt Peak || Spacewatch || — || align=right | 3.9 km || 
|-id=015 bgcolor=#d6d6d6
| 310015 ||  || — || May 27, 2009 || Kitt Peak || Spacewatch || EOS || align=right | 2.3 km || 
|-id=016 bgcolor=#C2FFFF
| 310016 ||  || — || May 29, 2009 || Kitt Peak || Spacewatch || L5 || align=right | 11 km || 
|-id=017 bgcolor=#E9E9E9
| 310017 ||  || — || June 13, 2009 || Kitt Peak || Spacewatch || DOR || align=right | 2.4 km || 
|-id=018 bgcolor=#E9E9E9
| 310018 ||  || — || June 14, 2009 || Kitt Peak || Spacewatch || ADE || align=right | 2.4 km || 
|-id=019 bgcolor=#E9E9E9
| 310019 ||  || — || June 1, 2009 || Catalina || CSS || BRU || align=right | 4.5 km || 
|-id=020 bgcolor=#fefefe
| 310020 ||  || — || August 16, 2009 || Kitt Peak || Spacewatch || — || align=right data-sort-value="0.90" | 900 m || 
|-id=021 bgcolor=#fefefe
| 310021 ||  || — || September 13, 2009 || Kachina || J. Hobart || MAS || align=right data-sort-value="0.84" | 840 m || 
|-id=022 bgcolor=#C2FFFF
| 310022 ||  || — || September 14, 2009 || Kitt Peak || Spacewatch || L4 || align=right | 8.3 km || 
|-id=023 bgcolor=#E9E9E9
| 310023 ||  || — || September 20, 2009 || Kitt Peak || Spacewatch || HEN || align=right data-sort-value="0.90" | 900 m || 
|-id=024 bgcolor=#FA8072
| 310024 || 2009 TA || — || October 2, 2009 || Mount Lemmon || Mount Lemmon Survey || — || align=right | 3.3 km || 
|-id=025 bgcolor=#C2FFFF
| 310025 ||  || — || October 14, 2009 || La Sagra || OAM Obs. || L4 || align=right | 13 km || 
|-id=026 bgcolor=#E9E9E9
| 310026 ||  || — || October 16, 2009 || La Sagra || OAM Obs. || — || align=right | 3.8 km || 
|-id=027 bgcolor=#C2FFFF
| 310027 ||  || — || February 8, 2002 || Palomar || NEAT || L4 || align=right | 11 km || 
|-id=028 bgcolor=#fefefe
| 310028 ||  || — || July 25, 2007 || Siding Spring || SSS || PHO || align=right | 2.2 km || 
|-id=029 bgcolor=#fefefe
| 310029 ||  || — || March 14, 2000 || Kitt Peak || Spacewatch || FLO || align=right data-sort-value="0.52" | 520 m || 
|-id=030 bgcolor=#fefefe
| 310030 ||  || — || March 12, 2010 || Mount Lemmon || Mount Lemmon Survey || — || align=right data-sort-value="0.83" | 830 m || 
|-id=031 bgcolor=#fefefe
| 310031 ||  || — || March 16, 2010 || Kitt Peak || Spacewatch || — || align=right data-sort-value="0.81" | 810 m || 
|-id=032 bgcolor=#fefefe
| 310032 ||  || — || March 20, 2010 || Kitt Peak || Spacewatch || — || align=right data-sort-value="0.80" | 800 m || 
|-id=033 bgcolor=#d6d6d6
| 310033 ||  || — || March 25, 2010 || Kitt Peak || Spacewatch || — || align=right | 3.6 km || 
|-id=034 bgcolor=#fefefe
| 310034 ||  || — || April 6, 2010 || Catalina || CSS || — || align=right | 1.0 km || 
|-id=035 bgcolor=#d6d6d6
| 310035 ||  || — || April 13, 2010 || WISE || WISE || BRA || align=right | 2.6 km || 
|-id=036 bgcolor=#E9E9E9
| 310036 ||  || — || October 11, 2007 || Kitt Peak || Spacewatch || — || align=right | 2.2 km || 
|-id=037 bgcolor=#fefefe
| 310037 ||  || — || April 7, 2010 || Kitt Peak || Spacewatch || V || align=right data-sort-value="0.79" | 790 m || 
|-id=038 bgcolor=#fefefe
| 310038 ||  || — || September 12, 2007 || Mount Lemmon || Mount Lemmon Survey || NYS || align=right data-sort-value="0.84" | 840 m || 
|-id=039 bgcolor=#fefefe
| 310039 ||  || — || April 10, 2010 || Kitt Peak || Spacewatch || — || align=right | 1.2 km || 
|-id=040 bgcolor=#fefefe
| 310040 ||  || — || July 6, 2003 || Kitt Peak || Spacewatch || ERI || align=right | 1.9 km || 
|-id=041 bgcolor=#fefefe
| 310041 ||  || — || April 10, 2010 || Kitt Peak || Spacewatch || — || align=right data-sort-value="0.89" | 890 m || 
|-id=042 bgcolor=#E9E9E9
| 310042 ||  || — || April 10, 2010 || Kitt Peak || Spacewatch || — || align=right | 2.2 km || 
|-id=043 bgcolor=#d6d6d6
| 310043 ||  || — || December 30, 2008 || Mount Lemmon || Mount Lemmon Survey || HYG || align=right | 3.7 km || 
|-id=044 bgcolor=#fefefe
| 310044 ||  || — || April 10, 2010 || Mount Lemmon || Mount Lemmon Survey || FLO || align=right data-sort-value="0.71" | 710 m || 
|-id=045 bgcolor=#fefefe
| 310045 ||  || — || January 23, 2006 || Kitt Peak || Spacewatch || V || align=right data-sort-value="0.81" | 810 m || 
|-id=046 bgcolor=#d6d6d6
| 310046 ||  || — || September 6, 1999 || Kitt Peak || Spacewatch || — || align=right | 3.7 km || 
|-id=047 bgcolor=#C2FFFF
| 310047 ||  || — || April 22, 2010 || WISE || WISE || L5 || align=right | 15 km || 
|-id=048 bgcolor=#d6d6d6
| 310048 ||  || — || April 26, 2010 || WISE || WISE || EUP || align=right | 5.2 km || 
|-id=049 bgcolor=#fefefe
| 310049 ||  || — || April 20, 2010 || Mount Lemmon || Mount Lemmon Survey || — || align=right | 1.2 km || 
|-id=050 bgcolor=#fefefe
| 310050 ||  || — || April 20, 2010 || Kitt Peak || Spacewatch || — || align=right | 1.9 km || 
|-id=051 bgcolor=#d6d6d6
| 310051 ||  || — || April 28, 2010 || WISE || WISE || TIR || align=right | 2.4 km || 
|-id=052 bgcolor=#fefefe
| 310052 ||  || — || May 3, 2010 || Kitt Peak || Spacewatch || NYS || align=right data-sort-value="0.79" | 790 m || 
|-id=053 bgcolor=#fefefe
| 310053 ||  || — || May 3, 2010 || Kitt Peak || Spacewatch || — || align=right | 1.0 km || 
|-id=054 bgcolor=#d6d6d6
| 310054 ||  || — || May 6, 2010 || Mount Lemmon || Mount Lemmon Survey || — || align=right | 4.5 km || 
|-id=055 bgcolor=#fefefe
| 310055 ||  || — || May 8, 2010 || Mount Lemmon || Mount Lemmon Survey || FLO || align=right | 1.3 km || 
|-id=056 bgcolor=#fefefe
| 310056 ||  || — || March 27, 1995 || Kitt Peak || Spacewatch || NYS || align=right data-sort-value="0.60" | 600 m || 
|-id=057 bgcolor=#d6d6d6
| 310057 ||  || — || May 7, 2010 || WISE || WISE || — || align=right | 5.4 km || 
|-id=058 bgcolor=#fefefe
| 310058 ||  || — || November 24, 2008 || Mount Lemmon || Mount Lemmon Survey || — || align=right | 1.2 km || 
|-id=059 bgcolor=#E9E9E9
| 310059 ||  || — || May 13, 2010 || Siding Spring || SSS || — || align=right | 1.8 km || 
|-id=060 bgcolor=#fefefe
| 310060 ||  || — || January 5, 2006 || Catalina || CSS || — || align=right | 1.2 km || 
|-id=061 bgcolor=#d6d6d6
| 310061 ||  || — || September 25, 2005 || Kitt Peak || Spacewatch || LIX || align=right | 4.3 km || 
|-id=062 bgcolor=#E9E9E9
| 310062 ||  || — || October 16, 2002 || Palomar || NEAT || GEF || align=right | 1.7 km || 
|-id=063 bgcolor=#E9E9E9
| 310063 ||  || — || May 6, 2010 || Catalina || CSS || — || align=right | 1.5 km || 
|-id=064 bgcolor=#E9E9E9
| 310064 ||  || — || May 4, 2010 || Kitt Peak || Spacewatch || — || align=right data-sort-value="0.90" | 900 m || 
|-id=065 bgcolor=#fefefe
| 310065 ||  || — || January 26, 2006 || Mount Lemmon || Mount Lemmon Survey || — || align=right data-sort-value="0.69" | 690 m || 
|-id=066 bgcolor=#fefefe
| 310066 ||  || — || February 25, 2006 || Mount Lemmon || Mount Lemmon Survey || MAS || align=right data-sort-value="0.86" | 860 m || 
|-id=067 bgcolor=#E9E9E9
| 310067 ||  || — || September 28, 2003 || Kitt Peak || Spacewatch || — || align=right | 2.2 km || 
|-id=068 bgcolor=#E9E9E9
| 310068 ||  || — || May 16, 2010 || Nogales || Tenagra II Obs. || JUN || align=right | 1.4 km || 
|-id=069 bgcolor=#E9E9E9
| 310069 ||  || — || February 3, 2009 || Mount Lemmon || Mount Lemmon Survey || — || align=right | 1.8 km || 
|-id=070 bgcolor=#E9E9E9
| 310070 ||  || — || May 23, 2010 || WISE || WISE || GEF || align=right | 2.1 km || 
|-id=071 bgcolor=#C7FF8F
| 310071 ||  || — || May 18, 2010 || WISE || WISE || centaurcritical || align=right | 110 km || 
|-id=072 bgcolor=#fefefe
| 310072 ||  || — || May 18, 2010 || La Sagra || OAM Obs. || — || align=right data-sort-value="0.76" | 760 m || 
|-id=073 bgcolor=#d6d6d6
| 310073 ||  || — || February 10, 2007 || Mount Lemmon || Mount Lemmon Survey || 7:4 || align=right | 5.8 km || 
|-id=074 bgcolor=#d6d6d6
| 310074 ||  || — || May 28, 2010 || WISE || WISE || EOS || align=right | 2.7 km || 
|-id=075 bgcolor=#d6d6d6
| 310075 ||  || — || May 28, 2010 || WISE || WISE || — || align=right | 2.8 km || 
|-id=076 bgcolor=#d6d6d6
| 310076 ||  || — || May 29, 2010 || WISE || WISE || — || align=right | 2.9 km || 
|-id=077 bgcolor=#d6d6d6
| 310077 ||  || — || May 29, 2010 || WISE || WISE || — || align=right | 4.2 km || 
|-id=078 bgcolor=#E9E9E9
| 310078 ||  || — || May 30, 2010 || WISE || WISE || CLO || align=right | 2.5 km || 
|-id=079 bgcolor=#fefefe
| 310079 ||  || — || May 22, 2010 || Siding Spring || SSS || — || align=right data-sort-value="0.83" | 830 m || 
|-id=080 bgcolor=#fefefe
| 310080 ||  || — || June 1, 2010 || Kitt Peak || Spacewatch || FLO || align=right data-sort-value="0.96" | 960 m || 
|-id=081 bgcolor=#fefefe
| 310081 ||  || — || June 2, 2010 || Nogales || Tenagra II Obs. || NYS || align=right data-sort-value="0.79" | 790 m || 
|-id=082 bgcolor=#d6d6d6
| 310082 ||  || — || March 12, 2008 || Catalina || CSS || — || align=right | 5.5 km || 
|-id=083 bgcolor=#E9E9E9
| 310083 ||  || — || June 11, 2010 || WISE || WISE || HNS || align=right | 2.6 km || 
|-id=084 bgcolor=#E9E9E9
| 310084 ||  || — || November 10, 1994 || Kitt Peak || Spacewatch || — || align=right | 1.7 km || 
|-id=085 bgcolor=#d6d6d6
| 310085 ||  || — || September 24, 2005 || Kitt Peak || Spacewatch || — || align=right | 4.2 km || 
|-id=086 bgcolor=#d6d6d6
| 310086 ||  || — || February 21, 2007 || Mount Lemmon || Mount Lemmon Survey || SYL7:4 || align=right | 4.6 km || 
|-id=087 bgcolor=#d6d6d6
| 310087 ||  || — || December 13, 2006 || Mount Lemmon || Mount Lemmon Survey || — || align=right | 3.4 km || 
|-id=088 bgcolor=#d6d6d6
| 310088 ||  || — || June 29, 2010 || WISE || WISE || — || align=right | 4.6 km || 
|-id=089 bgcolor=#E9E9E9
| 310089 ||  || — || July 4, 2010 || Kitt Peak || Spacewatch || — || align=right | 3.4 km || 
|-id=090 bgcolor=#E9E9E9
| 310090 ||  || — || February 24, 2009 || Catalina || CSS || AER || align=right | 1.6 km || 
|-id=091 bgcolor=#E9E9E9
| 310091 ||  || — || October 15, 2007 || Mount Lemmon || Mount Lemmon Survey || — || align=right | 2.3 km || 
|-id=092 bgcolor=#fefefe
| 310092 ||  || — || August 2, 2010 || Socorro || LINEAR || NYS || align=right | 1.2 km || 
|-id=093 bgcolor=#d6d6d6
| 310093 ||  || — || November 23, 1998 || Kitt Peak || Spacewatch || 7:4 || align=right | 3.0 km || 
|-id=094 bgcolor=#d6d6d6
| 310094 ||  || — || September 24, 2005 || Kitt Peak || Spacewatch || — || align=right | 2.5 km || 
|-id=095 bgcolor=#fefefe
| 310095 ||  || — || August 13, 2010 || Socorro || LINEAR || H || align=right | 1.3 km || 
|-id=096 bgcolor=#d6d6d6
| 310096 ||  || — || August 10, 2010 || Kitt Peak || Spacewatch || — || align=right | 3.3 km || 
|-id=097 bgcolor=#d6d6d6
| 310097 ||  || — || December 2, 2005 || Kitt Peak || Spacewatch || LUT || align=right | 5.9 km || 
|-id=098 bgcolor=#fefefe
| 310098 ||  || — || August 10, 2010 || Purple Mountain || PMO NEO || MAS || align=right data-sort-value="0.97" | 970 m || 
|-id=099 bgcolor=#d6d6d6
| 310099 ||  || — || September 3, 2010 || Socorro || LINEAR || — || align=right | 4.3 km || 
|-id=100 bgcolor=#d6d6d6
| 310100 ||  || — || September 3, 2010 || Piszkéstető || K. Sárneczky, Z. Kuli || HYG || align=right | 3.1 km || 
|}

310101–310200 

|-bgcolor=#E9E9E9
| 310101 ||  || — || September 6, 2010 || La Sagra || OAM Obs. || — || align=right | 1.6 km || 
|-id=102 bgcolor=#d6d6d6
| 310102 ||  || — || October 28, 2005 || Mount Lemmon || Mount Lemmon Survey || — || align=right | 3.0 km || 
|-id=103 bgcolor=#C2FFFF
| 310103 ||  || — || October 14, 1998 || Kitt Peak || Spacewatch || L4 || align=right | 11 km || 
|-id=104 bgcolor=#C2FFFF
| 310104 ||  || — || November 22, 1997 || Kitt Peak || Spacewatch || L4 || align=right | 11 km || 
|-id=105 bgcolor=#C2FFFF
| 310105 ||  || — || February 6, 2002 || Kitt Peak || Spacewatch || L4 || align=right | 8.3 km || 
|-id=106 bgcolor=#C2FFFF
| 310106 ||  || — || January 17, 2001 || Kitt Peak || Spacewatch || L4 || align=right | 12 km || 
|-id=107 bgcolor=#C2FFFF
| 310107 ||  || — || October 29, 2010 || Catalina || CSS || L4 || align=right | 14 km || 
|-id=108 bgcolor=#fefefe
| 310108 ||  || — || August 27, 2006 || Kitt Peak || Spacewatch || NYS || align=right data-sort-value="0.74" | 740 m || 
|-id=109 bgcolor=#d6d6d6
| 310109 ||  || — || January 14, 2002 || Palomar || NEAT || — || align=right | 3.0 km || 
|-id=110 bgcolor=#C2FFFF
| 310110 ||  || — || September 21, 2008 || Catalina || CSS || L4 || align=right | 12 km || 
|-id=111 bgcolor=#d6d6d6
| 310111 ||  || — || December 17, 2000 || Kitt Peak || Spacewatch || — || align=right | 4.5 km || 
|-id=112 bgcolor=#C2FFFF
| 310112 ||  || — || June 22, 2007 || Kitt Peak || Spacewatch || L4 || align=right | 12 km || 
|-id=113 bgcolor=#E9E9E9
| 310113 ||  || — || September 20, 2001 || Socorro || LINEAR || HEN || align=right | 1.3 km || 
|-id=114 bgcolor=#E9E9E9
| 310114 ||  || — || March 16, 2004 || Kitt Peak || Spacewatch || — || align=right | 1.2 km || 
|-id=115 bgcolor=#C2FFFF
| 310115 ||  || — || April 7, 2003 || Kitt Peak || Spacewatch || L4 || align=right | 11 km || 
|-id=116 bgcolor=#E9E9E9
| 310116 ||  || — || October 8, 2005 || Catalina || CSS || — || align=right | 1.7 km || 
|-id=117 bgcolor=#E9E9E9
| 310117 ||  || — || March 11, 2002 || Palomar || NEAT || MRX || align=right | 1.1 km || 
|-id=118 bgcolor=#d6d6d6
| 310118 ||  || — || November 22, 2009 || Catalina || CSS || TEL || align=right | 1.6 km || 
|-id=119 bgcolor=#d6d6d6
| 310119 ||  || — || January 26, 2006 || Catalina || CSS || FIR || align=right | 4.1 km || 
|-id=120 bgcolor=#d6d6d6
| 310120 ||  || — || December 11, 2004 || Kitt Peak || Spacewatch || THM || align=right | 2.3 km || 
|-id=121 bgcolor=#d6d6d6
| 310121 ||  || — || February 9, 2005 || Anderson Mesa || LONEOS || Tj (2.94) || align=right | 5.3 km || 
|-id=122 bgcolor=#E9E9E9
| 310122 ||  || — || February 13, 2002 || Kitt Peak || Spacewatch || NEM || align=right | 2.7 km || 
|-id=123 bgcolor=#fefefe
| 310123 ||  || — || September 25, 2005 || Kitt Peak || Spacewatch || — || align=right data-sort-value="0.94" | 940 m || 
|-id=124 bgcolor=#d6d6d6
| 310124 ||  || — || April 20, 2006 || Kitt Peak || Spacewatch || — || align=right | 2.6 km || 
|-id=125 bgcolor=#d6d6d6
| 310125 ||  || — || October 8, 1999 || Kitt Peak || Spacewatch || CHA || align=right | 2.7 km || 
|-id=126 bgcolor=#d6d6d6
| 310126 ||  || — || November 14, 2002 || Palomar || NEAT || — || align=right | 5.1 km || 
|-id=127 bgcolor=#E9E9E9
| 310127 ||  || — || March 9, 2003 || Anderson Mesa || LONEOS || — || align=right | 1.8 km || 
|-id=128 bgcolor=#d6d6d6
| 310128 ||  || — || May 20, 2006 || Catalina || CSS || — || align=right | 3.6 km || 
|-id=129 bgcolor=#E9E9E9
| 310129 ||  || — || April 28, 2003 || Kitt Peak || Spacewatch || — || align=right | 1.2 km || 
|-id=130 bgcolor=#E9E9E9
| 310130 ||  || — || January 23, 2006 || Kitt Peak || Spacewatch || MRX || align=right | 1.0 km || 
|-id=131 bgcolor=#E9E9E9
| 310131 ||  || — || January 22, 2006 || Catalina || CSS || — || align=right | 3.6 km || 
|-id=132 bgcolor=#d6d6d6
| 310132 ||  || — || January 13, 2005 || Catalina || CSS || — || align=right | 3.6 km || 
|-id=133 bgcolor=#d6d6d6
| 310133 ||  || — || February 29, 2000 || Socorro || LINEAR || EOS || align=right | 2.4 km || 
|-id=134 bgcolor=#d6d6d6
| 310134 ||  || — || October 11, 2001 || Socorro || LINEAR || — || align=right | 4.0 km || 
|-id=135 bgcolor=#E9E9E9
| 310135 ||  || — || December 14, 2004 || Socorro || LINEAR || — || align=right | 3.6 km || 
|-id=136 bgcolor=#d6d6d6
| 310136 ||  || — || September 14, 2007 || Mount Lemmon || Mount Lemmon Survey || — || align=right | 3.3 km || 
|-id=137 bgcolor=#d6d6d6
| 310137 ||  || — || February 1, 2005 || Kitt Peak || Spacewatch || NAE || align=right | 3.3 km || 
|-id=138 bgcolor=#fefefe
| 310138 ||  || — || October 25, 2005 || Catalina || CSS || V || align=right data-sort-value="0.83" | 830 m || 
|-id=139 bgcolor=#d6d6d6
| 310139 ||  || — || October 9, 2007 || Mount Lemmon || Mount Lemmon Survey || — || align=right | 3.2 km || 
|-id=140 bgcolor=#E9E9E9
| 310140 ||  || — || April 10, 2002 || Socorro || LINEAR || — || align=right | 3.6 km || 
|-id=141 bgcolor=#d6d6d6
| 310141 ||  || — || November 19, 2003 || Palomar || NEAT || — || align=right | 3.8 km || 
|-id=142 bgcolor=#fefefe
| 310142 ||  || — || September 13, 2005 || Catalina || CSS || — || align=right data-sort-value="0.86" | 860 m || 
|-id=143 bgcolor=#E9E9E9
| 310143 ||  || — || March 24, 2006 || Kitt Peak || Spacewatch || PAD || align=right | 2.5 km || 
|-id=144 bgcolor=#E9E9E9
| 310144 ||  || — || April 12, 2002 || Socorro || LINEAR || — || align=right | 2.1 km || 
|-id=145 bgcolor=#d6d6d6
| 310145 ||  || — || November 19, 2001 || Socorro || LINEAR || — || align=right | 4.4 km || 
|-id=146 bgcolor=#d6d6d6
| 310146 ||  || — || December 21, 2003 || Kitt Peak || Spacewatch || EOS || align=right | 2.6 km || 
|-id=147 bgcolor=#fefefe
| 310147 ||  || — || November 4, 2004 || Kitt Peak || Spacewatch || H || align=right data-sort-value="0.86" | 860 m || 
|-id=148 bgcolor=#fefefe
| 310148 ||  || — || May 1, 2003 || Kitt Peak || Spacewatch || — || align=right | 1.2 km || 
|-id=149 bgcolor=#fefefe
| 310149 ||  || — || February 23, 2007 || Kitt Peak || Spacewatch || FLO || align=right data-sort-value="0.72" | 720 m || 
|-id=150 bgcolor=#d6d6d6
| 310150 ||  || — || January 18, 2008 || Mount Lemmon || Mount Lemmon Survey || — || align=right | 3.9 km || 
|-id=151 bgcolor=#E9E9E9
| 310151 ||  || — || November 20, 2007 || Catalina || CSS || — || align=right | 5.2 km || 
|-id=152 bgcolor=#E9E9E9
| 310152 ||  || — || October 31, 2002 || Socorro || LINEAR || — || align=right | 3.4 km || 
|-id=153 bgcolor=#fefefe
| 310153 ||  || — || October 14, 2001 || Kitt Peak || Spacewatch || — || align=right data-sort-value="0.69" | 690 m || 
|-id=154 bgcolor=#E9E9E9
| 310154 ||  || — || November 19, 2007 || Kitt Peak || Spacewatch || — || align=right | 1.6 km || 
|-id=155 bgcolor=#fefefe
| 310155 ||  || — || April 7, 2003 || Kitt Peak || Spacewatch || FLO || align=right data-sort-value="0.90" | 900 m || 
|-id=156 bgcolor=#d6d6d6
| 310156 ||  || — || October 16, 2006 || Catalina || CSS || — || align=right | 4.4 km || 
|-id=157 bgcolor=#fefefe
| 310157 ||  || — || November 4, 2004 || Needville || Needville Obs. || — || align=right data-sort-value="0.94" | 940 m || 
|-id=158 bgcolor=#d6d6d6
| 310158 ||  || — || October 21, 1995 || Kitt Peak || Spacewatch || — || align=right | 3.5 km || 
|-id=159 bgcolor=#fefefe
| 310159 ||  || — || December 5, 2008 || Mount Lemmon || Mount Lemmon Survey || — || align=right data-sort-value="0.99" | 990 m || 
|-id=160 bgcolor=#E9E9E9
| 310160 ||  || — || May 10, 2002 || Palomar || NEAT || — || align=right | 1.3 km || 
|-id=161 bgcolor=#fefefe
| 310161 ||  || — || April 2, 2006 || Kitt Peak || Spacewatch || V || align=right data-sort-value="0.79" | 790 m || 
|-id=162 bgcolor=#fefefe
| 310162 ||  || — || April 5, 1995 || Kitt Peak || Spacewatch || V || align=right | 1.0 km || 
|-id=163 bgcolor=#d6d6d6
| 310163 ||  || — || September 30, 2005 || Catalina || CSS || ULA7:4 || align=right | 5.3 km || 
|-id=164 bgcolor=#fefefe
| 310164 ||  || — || February 9, 2002 || Kitt Peak || Spacewatch || — || align=right | 1.1 km || 
|-id=165 bgcolor=#fefefe
| 310165 ||  || — || December 22, 2008 || Catalina || CSS || FLO || align=right data-sort-value="0.81" | 810 m || 
|-id=166 bgcolor=#E9E9E9
| 310166 ||  || — || November 16, 2003 || Kitt Peak || Spacewatch || — || align=right | 1.1 km || 
|-id=167 bgcolor=#fefefe
| 310167 ||  || — || August 24, 2000 || Socorro || LINEAR || NYS || align=right data-sort-value="0.76" | 760 m || 
|-id=168 bgcolor=#d6d6d6
| 310168 ||  || — || August 19, 2006 || Kitt Peak || Spacewatch || KOR || align=right | 1.7 km || 
|-id=169 bgcolor=#E9E9E9
| 310169 ||  || — || October 4, 2003 || Kitt Peak || Spacewatch || — || align=right | 1.8 km || 
|-id=170 bgcolor=#d6d6d6
| 310170 ||  || — || August 26, 2000 || Cerro Tololo || M. W. Buie || — || align=right | 3.7 km || 
|-id=171 bgcolor=#E9E9E9
| 310171 ||  || — || May 8, 2006 || Siding Spring || SSS || — || align=right | 2.1 km || 
|-id=172 bgcolor=#E9E9E9
| 310172 ||  || — || November 2, 2007 || Kitt Peak || Spacewatch || — || align=right | 2.5 km || 
|-id=173 bgcolor=#E9E9E9
| 310173 ||  || — || August 3, 2002 || Campo Imperatore || CINEOS || — || align=right | 2.1 km || 
|-id=174 bgcolor=#fefefe
| 310174 ||  || — || February 4, 2005 || Mount Lemmon || Mount Lemmon Survey || — || align=right data-sort-value="0.94" | 940 m || 
|-id=175 bgcolor=#fefefe
| 310175 ||  || — || January 15, 2005 || Kitt Peak || Spacewatch || MAS || align=right | 1.0 km || 
|-id=176 bgcolor=#E9E9E9
| 310176 ||  || — || July 18, 2006 || Siding Spring || SSS || — || align=right | 2.5 km || 
|-id=177 bgcolor=#E9E9E9
| 310177 ||  || — || March 8, 2005 || Kitt Peak || Spacewatch || MAR || align=right data-sort-value="0.96" | 960 m || 
|-id=178 bgcolor=#E9E9E9
| 310178 ||  || — || June 23, 2006 || Palomar || NEAT || — || align=right | 2.6 km || 
|-id=179 bgcolor=#fefefe
| 310179 ||  || — || December 14, 2004 || Socorro || LINEAR || MAS || align=right data-sort-value="0.82" | 820 m || 
|-id=180 bgcolor=#d6d6d6
| 310180 ||  || — || October 23, 2006 || Mount Lemmon || Mount Lemmon Survey || — || align=right | 3.0 km || 
|-id=181 bgcolor=#fefefe
| 310181 ||  || — || September 21, 2000 || Kitt Peak || Spacewatch || — || align=right data-sort-value="0.86" | 860 m || 
|-id=182 bgcolor=#fefefe
| 310182 ||  || — || October 2, 1997 || Caussols || ODAS || NYS || align=right data-sort-value="0.63" | 630 m || 
|-id=183 bgcolor=#d6d6d6
| 310183 ||  || — || July 12, 2005 || Jarnac || Jarnac Obs. || — || align=right | 5.3 km || 
|-id=184 bgcolor=#E9E9E9
| 310184 ||  || — || May 14, 2010 || Mount Lemmon || Mount Lemmon Survey || — || align=right | 5.1 km || 
|-id=185 bgcolor=#fefefe
| 310185 ||  || — || August 27, 2000 || Cerro Tololo || M. W. Buie || — || align=right data-sort-value="0.58" | 580 m || 
|-id=186 bgcolor=#d6d6d6
| 310186 ||  || — || December 30, 2008 || Mount Lemmon || Mount Lemmon Survey || EOS || align=right | 2.6 km || 
|-id=187 bgcolor=#d6d6d6
| 310187 ||  || — || March 20, 1999 || Apache Point || SDSS || — || align=right | 2.4 km || 
|-id=188 bgcolor=#fefefe
| 310188 ||  || — || August 13, 2007 || Socorro || LINEAR || critical || align=right data-sort-value="0.98" | 980 m || 
|-id=189 bgcolor=#fefefe
| 310189 ||  || — || January 2, 2009 || Mount Lemmon || Mount Lemmon Survey || V || align=right | 1.1 km || 
|-id=190 bgcolor=#d6d6d6
| 310190 ||  || — || November 25, 2006 || Kitt Peak || Spacewatch || — || align=right | 5.6 km || 
|-id=191 bgcolor=#d6d6d6
| 310191 ||  || — || July 29, 2005 || Palomar || NEAT || — || align=right | 2.9 km || 
|-id=192 bgcolor=#E9E9E9
| 310192 ||  || — || March 17, 2005 || Kitt Peak || Spacewatch || — || align=right | 2.0 km || 
|-id=193 bgcolor=#fefefe
| 310193 ||  || — || December 31, 2008 || Kitt Peak || Spacewatch || MAS || align=right data-sort-value="0.93" | 930 m || 
|-id=194 bgcolor=#fefefe
| 310194 ||  || — || September 29, 2000 || Kitt Peak || Spacewatch || V || align=right data-sort-value="0.74" | 740 m || 
|-id=195 bgcolor=#d6d6d6
| 310195 ||  || — || April 20, 1998 || Kitt Peak || Spacewatch || — || align=right | 3.9 km || 
|-id=196 bgcolor=#d6d6d6
| 310196 ||  || — || February 13, 2004 || Kitt Peak || Spacewatch || K-2 || align=right | 1.8 km || 
|-id=197 bgcolor=#fefefe
| 310197 ||  || — || October 9, 1996 || Kitt Peak || Spacewatch || NYS || align=right data-sort-value="0.84" | 840 m || 
|-id=198 bgcolor=#E9E9E9
| 310198 ||  || — || March 11, 2005 || Kitt Peak || Spacewatch || — || align=right | 1.3 km || 
|-id=199 bgcolor=#d6d6d6
| 310199 ||  || — || August 28, 2006 || Kitt Peak || Spacewatch || KAR || align=right | 1.4 km || 
|-id=200 bgcolor=#E9E9E9
| 310200 ||  || — || January 16, 2004 || Kitt Peak || Spacewatch || — || align=right | 2.3 km || 
|}

310201–310300 

|-bgcolor=#d6d6d6
| 310201 ||  || — || September 13, 2005 || Kitt Peak || Spacewatch || — || align=right | 3.2 km || 
|-id=202 bgcolor=#d6d6d6
| 310202 ||  || — || October 28, 2006 || Mount Lemmon || Mount Lemmon Survey || — || align=right | 2.5 km || 
|-id=203 bgcolor=#fefefe
| 310203 ||  || — || March 12, 2002 || Kitt Peak || Spacewatch || — || align=right | 1.0 km || 
|-id=204 bgcolor=#d6d6d6
| 310204 ||  || — || September 23, 2005 || Catalina || CSS || THM || align=right | 3.3 km || 
|-id=205 bgcolor=#E9E9E9
| 310205 ||  || — || April 7, 2005 || Kitt Peak || Spacewatch || — || align=right | 2.5 km || 
|-id=206 bgcolor=#E9E9E9
| 310206 ||  || — || March 10, 2005 || Mount Lemmon || Mount Lemmon Survey || — || align=right | 2.6 km || 
|-id=207 bgcolor=#d6d6d6
| 310207 ||  || — || September 21, 1998 || Kitt Peak || Spacewatch || SYL7:4 || align=right | 4.8 km || 
|-id=208 bgcolor=#fefefe
| 310208 ||  || — || September 27, 2000 || Kitt Peak || Spacewatch || MAS || align=right data-sort-value="0.93" | 930 m || 
|-id=209 bgcolor=#E9E9E9
| 310209 ||  || — || November 12, 1999 || Kitt Peak || Spacewatch || — || align=right | 1.2 km || 
|-id=210 bgcolor=#E9E9E9
| 310210 ||  || — || February 2, 2000 || Kitt Peak || Spacewatch || — || align=right | 1.8 km || 
|-id=211 bgcolor=#E9E9E9
| 310211 ||  || — || March 21, 2004 || Kitt Peak || Spacewatch || — || align=right | 2.1 km || 
|-id=212 bgcolor=#d6d6d6
| 310212 ||  || — || September 19, 2006 || Kitt Peak || Spacewatch || KOR || align=right | 1.3 km || 
|-id=213 bgcolor=#d6d6d6
| 310213 ||  || — || September 29, 2005 || Catalina || CSS || — || align=right | 4.6 km || 
|-id=214 bgcolor=#d6d6d6
| 310214 ||  || — || November 16, 2006 || Mount Lemmon || Mount Lemmon Survey || HYG || align=right | 2.6 km || 
|-id=215 bgcolor=#d6d6d6
| 310215 ||  || — || September 7, 2000 || Kitt Peak || Spacewatch || — || align=right | 4.3 km || 
|-id=216 bgcolor=#d6d6d6
| 310216 ||  || — || August 30, 2005 || Kitt Peak || Spacewatch || THM || align=right | 2.9 km || 
|-id=217 bgcolor=#fefefe
| 310217 ||  || — || November 4, 2004 || Kitt Peak || Spacewatch || — || align=right data-sort-value="0.76" | 760 m || 
|-id=218 bgcolor=#d6d6d6
| 310218 ||  || — || November 17, 1995 || Kitt Peak || Spacewatch || — || align=right | 5.3 km || 
|-id=219 bgcolor=#d6d6d6
| 310219 ||  || — || November 21, 2000 || Socorro || LINEAR || — || align=right | 6.1 km || 
|-id=220 bgcolor=#d6d6d6
| 310220 ||  || — || September 19, 2006 || Kitt Peak || Spacewatch || — || align=right | 2.4 km || 
|-id=221 bgcolor=#fefefe
| 310221 ||  || — || October 7, 2004 || Kitt Peak || Spacewatch || NYS || align=right data-sort-value="0.52" | 520 m || 
|-id=222 bgcolor=#d6d6d6
| 310222 Vasipetropoulou ||  ||  || January 10, 2002 || Cima Ekar || ADAS || — || align=right | 3.3 km || 
|-id=223 bgcolor=#d6d6d6
| 310223 ||  || — || August 19, 2006 || Kitt Peak || Spacewatch || — || align=right | 3.2 km || 
|-id=224 bgcolor=#fefefe
| 310224 ||  || — || October 12, 1998 || Anderson Mesa || LONEOS || — || align=right | 1.0 km || 
|-id=225 bgcolor=#d6d6d6
| 310225 ||  || — || March 23, 2003 || Kitt Peak || Spacewatch || HYG || align=right | 3.7 km || 
|-id=226 bgcolor=#fefefe
| 310226 ||  || — || August 23, 2007 || Kitt Peak || Spacewatch || MAS || align=right data-sort-value="0.90" | 900 m || 
|-id=227 bgcolor=#E9E9E9
| 310227 ||  || — || February 19, 2001 || Socorro || LINEAR || RAF || align=right | 1.3 km || 
|-id=228 bgcolor=#E9E9E9
| 310228 ||  || — || April 30, 2000 || Kitt Peak || Spacewatch || — || align=right | 2.2 km || 
|-id=229 bgcolor=#d6d6d6
| 310229 ||  || — || May 9, 2005 || Mount Lemmon || Mount Lemmon Survey || — || align=right | 2.5 km || 
|-id=230 bgcolor=#fefefe
| 310230 ||  || — || March 2, 2006 || Kitt Peak || Spacewatch || MAS || align=right data-sort-value="0.99" | 990 m || 
|-id=231 bgcolor=#d6d6d6
| 310231 ||  || — || October 27, 2006 || Mount Lemmon || Mount Lemmon Survey || — || align=right | 2.5 km || 
|-id=232 bgcolor=#E9E9E9
| 310232 ||  || — || July 1, 2002 || Palomar || NEAT || — || align=right | 1.8 km || 
|-id=233 bgcolor=#d6d6d6
| 310233 ||  || — || May 14, 2004 || Kitt Peak || Spacewatch || — || align=right | 4.1 km || 
|-id=234 bgcolor=#d6d6d6
| 310234 ||  || — || September 13, 2005 || Catalina || CSS || — || align=right | 4.3 km || 
|-id=235 bgcolor=#E9E9E9
| 310235 ||  || — || March 3, 2000 || Apache Point || SDSS || — || align=right | 2.8 km || 
|-id=236 bgcolor=#E9E9E9
| 310236 ||  || — || February 11, 2004 || Kitt Peak || Spacewatch || — || align=right | 2.9 km || 
|-id=237 bgcolor=#d6d6d6
| 310237 ||  || — || March 23, 2003 || Apache Point || SDSS || — || align=right | 3.2 km || 
|-id=238 bgcolor=#d6d6d6
| 310238 ||  || — || April 25, 2003 || Kitt Peak || Spacewatch || — || align=right | 5.5 km || 
|-id=239 bgcolor=#E9E9E9
| 310239 ||  || — || August 21, 2006 || Kitt Peak || Spacewatch || HOF || align=right | 3.1 km || 
|-id=240 bgcolor=#fefefe
| 310240 ||  || — || December 17, 2003 || Socorro || LINEAR || H || align=right data-sort-value="0.77" | 770 m || 
|-id=241 bgcolor=#d6d6d6
| 310241 ||  || — || August 31, 2005 || Palomar || NEAT || EUP || align=right | 4.9 km || 
|-id=242 bgcolor=#E9E9E9
| 310242 ||  || — || January 30, 2004 || Kitt Peak || Spacewatch || MIS || align=right | 2.9 km || 
|-id=243 bgcolor=#E9E9E9
| 310243 ||  || — || October 11, 1977 || Palomar || PLS || ADE || align=right | 1.9 km || 
|-id=244 bgcolor=#fefefe
| 310244 ||  || — || September 11, 2007 || Kitt Peak || Spacewatch || V || align=right data-sort-value="0.88" | 880 m || 
|-id=245 bgcolor=#fefefe
| 310245 ||  || — || September 12, 2001 || Socorro || LINEAR || — || align=right data-sort-value="0.86" | 860 m || 
|-id=246 bgcolor=#fefefe
| 310246 ||  || — || October 17, 1995 || Kitt Peak || Spacewatch || — || align=right data-sort-value="0.68" | 680 m || 
|-id=247 bgcolor=#d6d6d6
| 310247 ||  || — || September 28, 2000 || Kitt Peak || Spacewatch || HYG || align=right | 3.0 km || 
|-id=248 bgcolor=#E9E9E9
| 310248 ||  || — || May 4, 2005 || Mount Lemmon || Mount Lemmon Survey || — || align=right | 2.0 km || 
|-id=249 bgcolor=#E9E9E9
| 310249 ||  || — || November 7, 2007 || Kitt Peak || Spacewatch || — || align=right | 1.3 km || 
|-id=250 bgcolor=#E9E9E9
| 310250 ||  || — || March 27, 2000 || Kitt Peak || Spacewatch || AGN || align=right | 1.6 km || 
|-id=251 bgcolor=#E9E9E9
| 310251 ||  || — || November 19, 1998 || Anderson Mesa || LONEOS || — || align=right | 2.4 km || 
|-id=252 bgcolor=#E9E9E9
| 310252 ||  || — || October 30, 2002 || Apache Point || SDSS || — || align=right | 2.8 km || 
|-id=253 bgcolor=#E9E9E9
| 310253 ||  || — || July 4, 2002 || Kitt Peak || Spacewatch || — || align=right | 1.7 km || 
|-id=254 bgcolor=#d6d6d6
| 310254 ||  || — || September 13, 2005 || Catalina || CSS || — || align=right | 3.9 km || 
|-id=255 bgcolor=#E9E9E9
| 310255 ||  || — || January 19, 2004 || Kitt Peak || Spacewatch || — || align=right | 1.5 km || 
|-id=256 bgcolor=#d6d6d6
| 310256 ||  || — || July 30, 2005 || Palomar || NEAT || — || align=right | 3.9 km || 
|-id=257 bgcolor=#fefefe
| 310257 ||  || — || July 15, 2007 || Siding Spring || SSS || FLO || align=right data-sort-value="0.81" | 810 m || 
|-id=258 bgcolor=#E9E9E9
| 310258 ||  || — || September 10, 2002 || Palomar || NEAT || EUN || align=right | 1.8 km || 
|-id=259 bgcolor=#d6d6d6
| 310259 ||  || — || November 16, 2006 || Mount Lemmon || Mount Lemmon Survey || EOS || align=right | 2.4 km || 
|-id=260 bgcolor=#d6d6d6
| 310260 ||  || — || December 14, 2006 || Eskridge || D. Tibbets || — || align=right | 5.3 km || 
|-id=261 bgcolor=#d6d6d6
| 310261 ||  || — || November 25, 2006 || Kitt Peak || Spacewatch || CRO || align=right | 4.3 km || 
|-id=262 bgcolor=#E9E9E9
| 310262 ||  || — || November 4, 2007 || Kitt Peak || Spacewatch || — || align=right | 2.6 km || 
|-id=263 bgcolor=#fefefe
| 310263 ||  || — || August 31, 2000 || Socorro || LINEAR || ERI || align=right | 2.1 km || 
|-id=264 bgcolor=#E9E9E9
| 310264 ||  || — || September 26, 2002 || Palomar || NEAT || — || align=right | 1.8 km || 
|-id=265 bgcolor=#E9E9E9
| 310265 ||  || — || September 18, 2006 || Kitt Peak || Spacewatch || WIT || align=right | 1.0 km || 
|-id=266 bgcolor=#E9E9E9
| 310266 ||  || — || September 26, 2006 || Kitt Peak || Spacewatch || — || align=right | 2.5 km || 
|-id=267 bgcolor=#d6d6d6
| 310267 ||  || — || November 19, 2006 || Kitt Peak || Spacewatch || — || align=right | 3.2 km || 
|-id=268 bgcolor=#fefefe
| 310268 ||  || — || September 21, 2000 || Anderson Mesa || LONEOS || NYS || align=right data-sort-value="0.76" | 760 m || 
|-id=269 bgcolor=#fefefe
| 310269 ||  || — || May 20, 2006 || Kitt Peak || Spacewatch || CLA || align=right | 1.6 km || 
|-id=270 bgcolor=#E9E9E9
| 310270 ||  || — || September 28, 2006 || Kitt Peak || Spacewatch || HOF || align=right | 3.0 km || 
|-id=271 bgcolor=#fefefe
| 310271 ||  || — || September 7, 2000 || Kitt Peak || Spacewatch || MAS || align=right data-sort-value="0.86" | 860 m || 
|-id=272 bgcolor=#d6d6d6
| 310272 ||  || — || December 13, 2006 || Kitt Peak || Spacewatch || HYG || align=right | 3.4 km || 
|-id=273 bgcolor=#fefefe
| 310273 Paulsmeyers ||  ||  || September 8, 2004 || Uccle || T. Pauwels, P. De Cat || NYS || align=right | 2.1 km || 
|-id=274 bgcolor=#E9E9E9
| 310274 ||  || — || October 28, 2006 || Catalina || CSS || — || align=right | 2.6 km || 
|-id=275 bgcolor=#fefefe
| 310275 ||  || — || November 20, 2004 || Kitt Peak || Spacewatch || — || align=right data-sort-value="0.94" | 940 m || 
|-id=276 bgcolor=#d6d6d6
| 310276 ||  || — || October 15, 2006 || Kitt Peak || Spacewatch || EOS || align=right | 3.3 km || 
|-id=277 bgcolor=#d6d6d6
| 310277 ||  || — || October 21, 2006 || Mount Lemmon || Mount Lemmon Survey || KOR || align=right | 1.4 km || 
|-id=278 bgcolor=#E9E9E9
| 310278 ||  || — || February 17, 2004 || Kitt Peak || Spacewatch || — || align=right | 1.5 km || 
|-id=279 bgcolor=#E9E9E9
| 310279 ||  || — || February 18, 2004 || Kitt Peak || Spacewatch || HEN || align=right | 1.6 km || 
|-id=280 bgcolor=#fefefe
| 310280 ||  || — || April 25, 2007 || Mount Lemmon || Mount Lemmon Survey || — || align=right data-sort-value="0.72" | 720 m || 
|-id=281 bgcolor=#d6d6d6
| 310281 ||  || — || October 1, 2000 || Socorro || LINEAR || — || align=right | 4.3 km || 
|-id=282 bgcolor=#E9E9E9
| 310282 ||  || — || October 29, 2003 || Kitt Peak || Spacewatch || — || align=right data-sort-value="0.97" | 970 m || 
|-id=283 bgcolor=#fefefe
| 310283 ||  || — || March 27, 2003 || Palomar || NEAT || FLO || align=right data-sort-value="0.99" | 990 m || 
|-id=284 bgcolor=#d6d6d6
| 310284 ||  || — || September 21, 2000 || Kitt Peak || Spacewatch || — || align=right | 3.1 km || 
|-id=285 bgcolor=#fefefe
| 310285 ||  || — || October 4, 2004 || Kitt Peak || Spacewatch || NYS || align=right data-sort-value="0.63" | 630 m || 
|-id=286 bgcolor=#d6d6d6
| 310286 ||  || — || November 17, 2006 || Kitt Peak || Spacewatch || — || align=right | 2.8 km || 
|-id=287 bgcolor=#E9E9E9
| 310287 ||  || — || November 2, 2007 || Kitt Peak || Spacewatch || — || align=right | 1.1 km || 
|-id=288 bgcolor=#E9E9E9
| 310288 ||  || — || December 3, 2002 || Palomar || NEAT || AGN || align=right | 1.3 km || 
|-id=289 bgcolor=#d6d6d6
| 310289 ||  || — || October 2, 2006 || Kitt Peak || Spacewatch || 628 || align=right | 1.9 km || 
|-id=290 bgcolor=#fefefe
| 310290 ||  || — || March 24, 2003 || Kitt Peak || Spacewatch || NYS || align=right data-sort-value="0.65" | 650 m || 
|-id=291 bgcolor=#d6d6d6
| 310291 ||  || — || November 1, 2000 || Socorro || LINEAR || — || align=right | 6.2 km || 
|-id=292 bgcolor=#E9E9E9
| 310292 ||  || — || April 11, 2005 || Mount Lemmon || Mount Lemmon Survey || — || align=right | 1.6 km || 
|-id=293 bgcolor=#d6d6d6
| 310293 ||  || — || February 7, 2002 || Palomar || NEAT || HYG || align=right | 2.9 km || 
|-id=294 bgcolor=#d6d6d6
| 310294 ||  || — || January 13, 2002 || Kitt Peak || Spacewatch || HYG || align=right | 3.2 km || 
|-id=295 bgcolor=#fefefe
| 310295 ||  || — || March 26, 2003 || Kitt Peak || Spacewatch || — || align=right data-sort-value="0.85" | 850 m || 
|-id=296 bgcolor=#E9E9E9
| 310296 ||  || — || October 13, 1998 || Kitt Peak || Spacewatch || — || align=right | 2.3 km || 
|-id=297 bgcolor=#E9E9E9
| 310297 ||  || — || September 14, 2002 || Palomar || NEAT || — || align=right | 1.2 km || 
|-id=298 bgcolor=#d6d6d6
| 310298 ||  || — || April 5, 2003 || Kitt Peak || Spacewatch || 7:4 || align=right | 4.3 km || 
|-id=299 bgcolor=#fefefe
| 310299 ||  || — || October 10, 2004 || Kitt Peak || Spacewatch || — || align=right | 1.2 km || 
|-id=300 bgcolor=#fefefe
| 310300 ||  || — || November 10, 2004 || Kitt Peak || Spacewatch || — || align=right data-sort-value="0.85" | 850 m || 
|}

310301–310400 

|-bgcolor=#fefefe
| 310301 ||  || — || September 13, 1996 || Kitt Peak || Spacewatch || EUT || align=right data-sort-value="0.59" | 590 m || 
|-id=302 bgcolor=#E9E9E9
| 310302 ||  || — || April 25, 2000 || Kitt Peak || Spacewatch || AST || align=right | 2.1 km || 
|-id=303 bgcolor=#E9E9E9
| 310303 ||  || — || September 19, 1973 || Palomar || PLS || — || align=right | 1.9 km || 
|-id=304 bgcolor=#E9E9E9
| 310304 ||  || — || March 4, 2005 || Mount Lemmon || Mount Lemmon Survey || — || align=right | 1.7 km || 
|-id=305 bgcolor=#d6d6d6
| 310305 ||  || — || September 24, 1995 || Kitt Peak || Spacewatch || — || align=right | 4.2 km || 
|-id=306 bgcolor=#d6d6d6
| 310306 ||  || — || November 1, 2000 || Socorro || LINEAR || — || align=right | 3.7 km || 
|-id=307 bgcolor=#E9E9E9
| 310307 ||  || — || October 3, 2002 || Socorro || LINEAR || — || align=right | 2.6 km || 
|-id=308 bgcolor=#fefefe
| 310308 ||  || — || December 2, 2008 || Kitt Peak || Spacewatch || — || align=right data-sort-value="0.78" | 780 m || 
|-id=309 bgcolor=#d6d6d6
| 310309 ||  || — || April 24, 2009 || Mount Lemmon || Mount Lemmon Survey || URS || align=right | 4.5 km || 
|-id=310 bgcolor=#fefefe
| 310310 ||  || — || October 19, 2007 || Catalina || CSS || — || align=right | 1.0 km || 
|-id=311 bgcolor=#fefefe
| 310311 ||  || — || September 13, 2007 || Mount Lemmon || Mount Lemmon Survey || MAS || align=right data-sort-value="0.75" | 750 m || 
|-id=312 bgcolor=#d6d6d6
| 310312 ||  || — || February 9, 2008 || Mount Lemmon || Mount Lemmon Survey || HYG || align=right | 3.0 km || 
|-id=313 bgcolor=#fefefe
| 310313 ||  || — || September 8, 2004 || Socorro || LINEAR || — || align=right data-sort-value="0.66" | 660 m || 
|-id=314 bgcolor=#d6d6d6
| 310314 ||  || — || March 10, 2003 || Anderson Mesa || LONEOS || — || align=right | 3.7 km || 
|-id=315 bgcolor=#d6d6d6
| 310315 ||  || — || October 28, 2005 || Catalina || CSS || — || align=right | 4.5 km || 
|-id=316 bgcolor=#fefefe
| 310316 ||  || — || November 20, 2004 || Kitt Peak || Spacewatch || — || align=right data-sort-value="0.79" | 790 m || 
|-id=317 bgcolor=#E9E9E9
| 310317 ||  || — || November 9, 2007 || Kitt Peak || Spacewatch || MIS || align=right | 2.7 km || 
|-id=318 bgcolor=#E9E9E9
| 310318 ||  || — || September 17, 2006 || Anderson Mesa || LONEOS || — || align=right | 2.3 km || 
|-id=319 bgcolor=#d6d6d6
| 310319 ||  || — || May 28, 2000 || Socorro || LINEAR || — || align=right | 2.4 km || 
|-id=320 bgcolor=#fefefe
| 310320 ||  || — || October 23, 1997 || Kitt Peak || Spacewatch || V || align=right data-sort-value="0.70" | 700 m || 
|-id=321 bgcolor=#fefefe
| 310321 ||  || — || February 9, 2005 || Kitt Peak || Spacewatch || MAS || align=right data-sort-value="0.78" | 780 m || 
|-id=322 bgcolor=#d6d6d6
| 310322 ||  || — || October 4, 2005 || Catalina || CSS || CRO || align=right | 3.6 km || 
|-id=323 bgcolor=#E9E9E9
| 310323 ||  || — || April 16, 2005 || Kitt Peak || Spacewatch || — || align=right | 1.1 km || 
|-id=324 bgcolor=#fefefe
| 310324 ||  || — || April 25, 2003 || Kitt Peak || Spacewatch || V || align=right data-sort-value="0.81" | 810 m || 
|-id=325 bgcolor=#E9E9E9
| 310325 ||  || — || September 5, 2002 || Socorro || LINEAR || — || align=right | 1.7 km || 
|-id=326 bgcolor=#fefefe
| 310326 ||  || — || February 10, 2002 || Socorro || LINEAR || FLO || align=right data-sort-value="0.83" | 830 m || 
|-id=327 bgcolor=#fefefe
| 310327 ||  || — || October 9, 2004 || Kitt Peak || Spacewatch || — || align=right | 2.4 km || 
|-id=328 bgcolor=#fefefe
| 310328 ||  || — || November 16, 2000 || Kitt Peak || Spacewatch || MAS || align=right data-sort-value="0.96" | 960 m || 
|-id=329 bgcolor=#E9E9E9
| 310329 ||  || — || September 18, 2006 || Catalina || CSS || PAD || align=right | 1.9 km || 
|-id=330 bgcolor=#d6d6d6
| 310330 ||  || — || May 12, 2004 || Siding Spring || SSS || TEL || align=right | 2.3 km || 
|-id=331 bgcolor=#E9E9E9
| 310331 ||  || — || February 1, 2000 || Kitt Peak || Spacewatch || — || align=right | 1.9 km || 
|-id=332 bgcolor=#E9E9E9
| 310332 ||  || — || August 13, 2002 || Palomar || NEAT || RAF || align=right | 2.8 km || 
|-id=333 bgcolor=#fefefe
| 310333 ||  || — || October 9, 2004 || Anderson Mesa || LONEOS || — || align=right | 1.2 km || 
|-id=334 bgcolor=#d6d6d6
| 310334 ||  || — || May 3, 2009 || Kitt Peak || Spacewatch || — || align=right | 4.6 km || 
|-id=335 bgcolor=#fefefe
| 310335 ||  || — || February 2, 2006 || Kitt Peak || Spacewatch || — || align=right | 1.2 km || 
|-id=336 bgcolor=#d6d6d6
| 310336 ||  || — || July 21, 2004 || Siding Spring || SSS || HYG || align=right | 3.5 km || 
|-id=337 bgcolor=#d6d6d6
| 310337 ||  || — || September 25, 2005 || Catalina || CSS || — || align=right | 4.2 km || 
|-id=338 bgcolor=#E9E9E9
| 310338 ||  || — || August 11, 1997 || Kitt Peak || Spacewatch || — || align=right | 2.5 km || 
|-id=339 bgcolor=#fefefe
| 310339 ||  || — || September 10, 2007 || Catalina || CSS || MAS || align=right data-sort-value="0.81" | 810 m || 
|-id=340 bgcolor=#d6d6d6
| 310340 ||  || — || April 30, 2004 || Kitt Peak || Spacewatch || — || align=right | 3.9 km || 
|-id=341 bgcolor=#E9E9E9
| 310341 ||  || — || April 30, 2005 || Kitt Peak || Spacewatch || NEM || align=right | 2.6 km || 
|-id=342 bgcolor=#fefefe
| 310342 ||  || — || September 30, 2005 || Mauna Kea || A. Boattini || — || align=right | 1.1 km || 
|-id=343 bgcolor=#E9E9E9
| 310343 ||  || — || June 24, 1997 || Caussols || ODAS || — || align=right | 2.0 km || 
|-id=344 bgcolor=#fefefe
| 310344 ||  || — || August 9, 2007 || Kitt Peak || Spacewatch || MAS || align=right data-sort-value="0.69" | 690 m || 
|-id=345 bgcolor=#d6d6d6
| 310345 ||  || — || September 30, 2005 || Anderson Mesa || LONEOS || — || align=right | 3.9 km || 
|-id=346 bgcolor=#E9E9E9
| 310346 ||  || — || September 14, 2002 || Haleakala || NEAT || — || align=right | 1.7 km || 
|-id=347 bgcolor=#d6d6d6
| 310347 ||  || — || December 4, 2000 || Haleakala || NEAT || THB || align=right | 4.2 km || 
|-id=348 bgcolor=#fefefe
| 310348 ||  || — || September 22, 2000 || Kitt Peak || Spacewatch || FLO || align=right data-sort-value="0.85" | 850 m || 
|-id=349 bgcolor=#E9E9E9
| 310349 ||  || — || August 8, 2002 || Palomar || NEAT || — || align=right | 1.4 km || 
|-id=350 bgcolor=#d6d6d6
| 310350 ||  || — || November 16, 2006 || Kitt Peak || Spacewatch || SAN || align=right | 3.4 km || 
|-id=351 bgcolor=#d6d6d6
| 310351 ||  || — || November 3, 2000 || Kitt Peak || Spacewatch || THM || align=right | 2.3 km || 
|-id=352 bgcolor=#d6d6d6
| 310352 ||  || — || November 11, 2007 || Mount Lemmon || Mount Lemmon Survey || EOS || align=right | 2.5 km || 
|-id=353 bgcolor=#E9E9E9
| 310353 ||  || — || September 15, 2006 || Kitt Peak || Spacewatch || — || align=right | 2.6 km || 
|-id=354 bgcolor=#E9E9E9
| 310354 ||  || — || October 2, 2002 || Kvistaberg || Kvistaberg Obs. || — || align=right | 1.6 km || 
|-id=355 bgcolor=#E9E9E9
| 310355 ||  || — || May 4, 2005 || Kitt Peak || Spacewatch || — || align=right | 3.0 km || 
|-id=356 bgcolor=#fefefe
| 310356 ||  || — || August 8, 2007 || Socorro || LINEAR || V || align=right data-sort-value="0.89" | 890 m || 
|-id=357 bgcolor=#d6d6d6
| 310357 ||  || — || October 8, 2005 || Junk Bond || D. Healy || — || align=right | 3.9 km || 
|-id=358 bgcolor=#E9E9E9
| 310358 ||  || — || May 24, 2006 || Mount Lemmon || Mount Lemmon Survey || MRX || align=right | 1.2 km || 
|-id=359 bgcolor=#d6d6d6
| 310359 ||  || — || September 30, 2005 || Anderson Mesa || LONEOS || VER || align=right | 3.8 km || 
|-id=360 bgcolor=#d6d6d6
| 310360 ||  || — || November 25, 2006 || Mount Lemmon || Mount Lemmon Survey || — || align=right | 4.0 km || 
|-id=361 bgcolor=#fefefe
| 310361 ||  || — || January 22, 1998 || Kitt Peak || Spacewatch || — || align=right | 1.3 km || 
|-id=362 bgcolor=#E9E9E9
| 310362 ||  || — || November 13, 1998 || Caussols || ODAS || EUN || align=right | 1.7 km || 
|-id=363 bgcolor=#E9E9E9
| 310363 ||  || — || April 14, 2010 || Mount Lemmon || Mount Lemmon Survey || — || align=right | 2.8 km || 
|-id=364 bgcolor=#E9E9E9
| 310364 ||  || — || February 9, 2005 || Mount Lemmon || Mount Lemmon Survey || MAR || align=right | 1.7 km || 
|-id=365 bgcolor=#E9E9E9
| 310365 ||  || — || December 19, 2003 || Socorro || LINEAR || — || align=right | 2.2 km || 
|-id=366 bgcolor=#fefefe
| 310366 ||  || — || March 26, 2003 || Palomar || NEAT || — || align=right data-sort-value="0.89" | 890 m || 
|-id=367 bgcolor=#fefefe
| 310367 ||  || — || October 21, 1995 || Kitt Peak || Spacewatch || — || align=right data-sort-value="0.79" | 790 m || 
|-id=368 bgcolor=#E9E9E9
| 310368 ||  || — || February 16, 2004 || Kitt Peak || Spacewatch || — || align=right | 4.0 km || 
|-id=369 bgcolor=#d6d6d6
| 310369 ||  || — || October 17, 2006 || Catalina || CSS || — || align=right | 3.3 km || 
|-id=370 bgcolor=#d6d6d6
| 310370 ||  || — || October 1, 2000 || Socorro || LINEAR || — || align=right | 3.7 km || 
|-id=371 bgcolor=#d6d6d6
| 310371 ||  || — || October 11, 2001 || Palomar || NEAT || — || align=right | 2.8 km || 
|-id=372 bgcolor=#E9E9E9
| 310372 ||  || — || July 16, 2002 || Palomar || NEAT || — || align=right | 2.6 km || 
|-id=373 bgcolor=#E9E9E9
| 310373 ||  || — || September 24, 1960 || Palomar || PLS || — || align=right | 1.9 km || 
|-id=374 bgcolor=#E9E9E9
| 310374 ||  || — || September 29, 1973 || Palomar || PLS || — || align=right | 1.2 km || 
|-id=375 bgcolor=#E9E9E9
| 310375 ||  || — || October 16, 1977 || Palomar || PLS || — || align=right | 1.5 km || 
|-id=376 bgcolor=#fefefe
| 310376 ||  || — || October 16, 1977 || Palomar || PLS || NYS || align=right data-sort-value="0.82" | 820 m || 
|-id=377 bgcolor=#fefefe
| 310377 ||  || — || October 20, 1993 || La Silla || E. W. Elst || — || align=right | 1.1 km || 
|-id=378 bgcolor=#E9E9E9
| 310378 ||  || — || March 6, 1994 || Kitt Peak || Spacewatch || — || align=right | 2.3 km || 
|-id=379 bgcolor=#FA8072
| 310379 || 1994 NZ || — || July 4, 1994 || Palomar || E. F. Helin || — || align=right | 2.6 km || 
|-id=380 bgcolor=#fefefe
| 310380 ||  || — || September 12, 1994 || Kitt Peak || Spacewatch || — || align=right data-sort-value="0.67" | 670 m || 
|-id=381 bgcolor=#d6d6d6
| 310381 ||  || — || September 28, 1994 || Kitt Peak || Spacewatch || THM || align=right | 2.3 km || 
|-id=382 bgcolor=#C2FFFF
| 310382 ||  || — || August 22, 1995 || Kitt Peak || Spacewatch || L4 || align=right | 11 km || 
|-id=383 bgcolor=#fefefe
| 310383 || 1995 SM || — || September 17, 1995 || Ondřejov || M. Wolf || NYS || align=right data-sort-value="0.86" | 860 m || 
|-id=384 bgcolor=#fefefe
| 310384 ||  || — || September 19, 1995 || Kitt Peak || Spacewatch || NYS || align=right | 1.1 km || 
|-id=385 bgcolor=#fefefe
| 310385 ||  || — || September 25, 1995 || Kitt Peak || Spacewatch || MAS || align=right data-sort-value="0.93" | 930 m || 
|-id=386 bgcolor=#fefefe
| 310386 ||  || — || December 4, 1996 || Kitt Peak || Spacewatch || — || align=right data-sort-value="0.57" | 570 m || 
|-id=387 bgcolor=#E9E9E9
| 310387 ||  || — || November 22, 1997 || Kitt Peak || Spacewatch || — || align=right | 2.3 km || 
|-id=388 bgcolor=#fefefe
| 310388 ||  || — || December 29, 1997 || Kitt Peak || Spacewatch || — || align=right data-sort-value="0.69" | 690 m || 
|-id=389 bgcolor=#fefefe
| 310389 ||  || — || February 24, 1998 || Kitt Peak || Spacewatch || — || align=right data-sort-value="0.92" | 920 m || 
|-id=390 bgcolor=#E9E9E9
| 310390 ||  || — || April 17, 1998 || Modra || A. Galád, A. Pravda || — || align=right | 2.4 km || 
|-id=391 bgcolor=#E9E9E9
| 310391 ||  || — || April 21, 1998 || Socorro || LINEAR || INO || align=right | 1.6 km || 
|-id=392 bgcolor=#E9E9E9
| 310392 ||  || — || June 27, 1998 || Kitt Peak || Spacewatch || — || align=right | 1.2 km || 
|-id=393 bgcolor=#E9E9E9
| 310393 ||  || — || September 14, 1998 || Socorro || LINEAR || — || align=right | 1.9 km || 
|-id=394 bgcolor=#E9E9E9
| 310394 ||  || — || September 14, 1998 || Socorro || LINEAR || — || align=right | 1.3 km || 
|-id=395 bgcolor=#FA8072
| 310395 ||  || — || October 14, 1998 || Caussols || ODAS || — || align=right data-sort-value="0.79" | 790 m || 
|-id=396 bgcolor=#E9E9E9
| 310396 ||  || — || November 14, 1998 || Kitt Peak || Spacewatch || — || align=right | 1.9 km || 
|-id=397 bgcolor=#C2FFFF
| 310397 ||  || — || November 15, 1998 || Kitt Peak || Spacewatch || L4 || align=right | 13 km || 
|-id=398 bgcolor=#E9E9E9
| 310398 ||  || — || January 9, 1999 || Kitt Peak || Spacewatch || — || align=right | 1.7 km || 
|-id=399 bgcolor=#fefefe
| 310399 ||  || — || February 10, 1999 || Socorro || LINEAR || H || align=right | 1.00 km || 
|-id=400 bgcolor=#E9E9E9
| 310400 ||  || — || February 10, 1999 || Socorro || LINEAR || — || align=right | 2.6 km || 
|}

310401–310500 

|-bgcolor=#E9E9E9
| 310401 ||  || — || February 12, 1999 || Socorro || LINEAR || — || align=right | 3.2 km || 
|-id=402 bgcolor=#FFC2E0
| 310402 ||  || — || March 15, 1999 || Socorro || LINEAR || AMO || align=right data-sort-value="0.69" | 690 m || 
|-id=403 bgcolor=#fefefe
| 310403 ||  || — || June 4, 1999 || Catalina || CSS || H || align=right | 1.2 km || 
|-id=404 bgcolor=#FA8072
| 310404 ||  || — || September 5, 1999 || Catalina || CSS || — || align=right data-sort-value="0.94" | 940 m || 
|-id=405 bgcolor=#fefefe
| 310405 ||  || — || September 10, 1999 || Kitt Peak || Spacewatch || — || align=right data-sort-value="0.89" | 890 m || 
|-id=406 bgcolor=#fefefe
| 310406 ||  || — || September 9, 1999 || Socorro || LINEAR || — || align=right | 1.3 km || 
|-id=407 bgcolor=#fefefe
| 310407 ||  || — || September 30, 1999 || Catalina || CSS || NYS || align=right data-sort-value="0.87" | 870 m || 
|-id=408 bgcolor=#fefefe
| 310408 ||  || — || October 3, 1999 || Kitt Peak || Spacewatch || — || align=right data-sort-value="0.87" | 870 m || 
|-id=409 bgcolor=#d6d6d6
| 310409 ||  || — || October 11, 1999 || Kitt Peak || Spacewatch || HYG || align=right | 2.3 km || 
|-id=410 bgcolor=#d6d6d6
| 310410 ||  || — || October 11, 1999 || Kitt Peak || Spacewatch || THM || align=right | 2.1 km || 
|-id=411 bgcolor=#fefefe
| 310411 ||  || — || October 4, 1999 || Socorro || LINEAR || NYS || align=right | 1.0 km || 
|-id=412 bgcolor=#fefefe
| 310412 ||  || — || October 6, 1999 || Socorro || LINEAR || — || align=right data-sort-value="0.94" | 940 m || 
|-id=413 bgcolor=#fefefe
| 310413 ||  || — || October 7, 1999 || Socorro || LINEAR || — || align=right | 1.5 km || 
|-id=414 bgcolor=#fefefe
| 310414 ||  || — || October 7, 1999 || Socorro || LINEAR || — || align=right | 1.1 km || 
|-id=415 bgcolor=#fefefe
| 310415 ||  || — || October 10, 1999 || Socorro || LINEAR || — || align=right | 1.1 km || 
|-id=416 bgcolor=#fefefe
| 310416 ||  || — || October 13, 1999 || Socorro || LINEAR || — || align=right | 1.3 km || 
|-id=417 bgcolor=#fefefe
| 310417 ||  || — || October 12, 1999 || Socorro || LINEAR || — || align=right | 1.3 km || 
|-id=418 bgcolor=#fefefe
| 310418 ||  || — || October 31, 1999 || Kitt Peak || Spacewatch || NYS || align=right data-sort-value="0.70" | 700 m || 
|-id=419 bgcolor=#fefefe
| 310419 ||  || — || October 31, 1999 || Kitt Peak || Spacewatch || NYS || align=right data-sort-value="0.73" | 730 m || 
|-id=420 bgcolor=#d6d6d6
| 310420 ||  || — || November 1, 1999 || Kitt Peak || Spacewatch || — || align=right | 4.1 km || 
|-id=421 bgcolor=#fefefe
| 310421 ||  || — || November 4, 1999 || Socorro || LINEAR || MAS || align=right | 1.0 km || 
|-id=422 bgcolor=#d6d6d6
| 310422 ||  || — || October 29, 1999 || Kitt Peak || Spacewatch || — || align=right | 3.4 km || 
|-id=423 bgcolor=#fefefe
| 310423 ||  || — || November 9, 1999 || Socorro || LINEAR || — || align=right data-sort-value="0.95" | 950 m || 
|-id=424 bgcolor=#d6d6d6
| 310424 ||  || — || November 4, 1999 || Kitt Peak || Spacewatch || — || align=right | 3.7 km || 
|-id=425 bgcolor=#fefefe
| 310425 ||  || — || November 9, 1999 || Socorro || LINEAR || NYS || align=right | 1.0 km || 
|-id=426 bgcolor=#fefefe
| 310426 ||  || — || November 12, 1999 || Kitt Peak || Spacewatch || — || align=right | 1.0 km || 
|-id=427 bgcolor=#fefefe
| 310427 ||  || — || November 15, 1999 || Socorro || LINEAR || — || align=right | 1.1 km || 
|-id=428 bgcolor=#fefefe
| 310428 ||  || — || November 30, 1999 || Kitt Peak || Spacewatch || — || align=right data-sort-value="0.97" | 970 m || 
|-id=429 bgcolor=#FA8072
| 310429 ||  || — || December 5, 1999 || Socorro || LINEAR || — || align=right | 2.1 km || 
|-id=430 bgcolor=#fefefe
| 310430 ||  || — || December 2, 1999 || Kitt Peak || Spacewatch || NYS || align=right | 1.0 km || 
|-id=431 bgcolor=#E9E9E9
| 310431 ||  || — || December 15, 1999 || Kitt Peak || Spacewatch || — || align=right | 1.4 km || 
|-id=432 bgcolor=#C2FFFF
| 310432 ||  || — || December 14, 1999 || Kitt Peak || Spacewatch || L4 || align=right | 14 km || 
|-id=433 bgcolor=#C2FFFF
| 310433 ||  || — || January 13, 2000 || Kitt Peak || Spacewatch || L4 || align=right | 14 km || 
|-id=434 bgcolor=#FA8072
| 310434 ||  || — || January 7, 2000 || Socorro || LINEAR || — || align=right | 2.8 km || 
|-id=435 bgcolor=#FA8072
| 310435 ||  || — || January 3, 2000 || Socorro || LINEAR || — || align=right | 1.4 km || 
|-id=436 bgcolor=#fefefe
| 310436 ||  || — || January 7, 2000 || Socorro || LINEAR || — || align=right | 2.3 km || 
|-id=437 bgcolor=#d6d6d6
| 310437 ||  || — || January 3, 2000 || Kitt Peak || Spacewatch || — || align=right | 4.9 km || 
|-id=438 bgcolor=#E9E9E9
| 310438 ||  || — || January 5, 2000 || Socorro || LINEAR || — || align=right | 1.6 km || 
|-id=439 bgcolor=#C2FFFF
| 310439 ||  || — || January 7, 2000 || Kitt Peak || Spacewatch || L4 || align=right | 12 km || 
|-id=440 bgcolor=#E9E9E9
| 310440 ||  || — || January 25, 2000 || Socorro || LINEAR || — || align=right | 4.8 km || 
|-id=441 bgcolor=#E9E9E9
| 310441 ||  || — || January 30, 2000 || Catalina || CSS || — || align=right | 1.5 km || 
|-id=442 bgcolor=#FFC2E0
| 310442 ||  || — || February 6, 2000 || Socorro || LINEAR || ATEPHA || align=right data-sort-value="0.38" | 380 m || 
|-id=443 bgcolor=#E9E9E9
| 310443 ||  || — || February 6, 2000 || Kitt Peak || M. W. Buie || — || align=right data-sort-value="0.98" | 980 m || 
|-id=444 bgcolor=#E9E9E9
| 310444 ||  || — || February 29, 2000 || Socorro || LINEAR || — || align=right | 1.0 km || 
|-id=445 bgcolor=#E9E9E9
| 310445 ||  || — || February 29, 2000 || Socorro || LINEAR || — || align=right | 1.5 km || 
|-id=446 bgcolor=#E9E9E9
| 310446 ||  || — || April 10, 2000 || Haleakala || NEAT || — || align=right | 1.7 km || 
|-id=447 bgcolor=#E9E9E9
| 310447 ||  || — || April 25, 2000 || Anderson Mesa || LONEOS || — || align=right | 1.9 km || 
|-id=448 bgcolor=#E9E9E9
| 310448 ||  || — || May 3, 2000 || Socorro || LINEAR || BAR || align=right | 1.5 km || 
|-id=449 bgcolor=#fefefe
| 310449 ||  || — || June 4, 2000 || Modra || L. Kornoš, P. Kolény || — || align=right | 1.6 km || 
|-id=450 bgcolor=#E9E9E9
| 310450 ||  || — || June 5, 2000 || Kitt Peak || Spacewatch || ADE || align=right | 3.9 km || 
|-id=451 bgcolor=#FA8072
| 310451 ||  || — || August 9, 2000 || Socorro || LINEAR || PHO || align=right | 2.0 km || 
|-id=452 bgcolor=#fefefe
| 310452 ||  || — || August 23, 2000 || Reedy Creek || J. Broughton || — || align=right data-sort-value="0.98" | 980 m || 
|-id=453 bgcolor=#fefefe
| 310453 ||  || — || August 24, 2000 || Socorro || LINEAR || NYS || align=right data-sort-value="0.69" | 690 m || 
|-id=454 bgcolor=#fefefe
| 310454 ||  || — || August 24, 2000 || Socorro || LINEAR || NYS || align=right data-sort-value="0.88" | 880 m || 
|-id=455 bgcolor=#fefefe
| 310455 ||  || — || August 24, 2000 || Socorro || LINEAR || — || align=right | 1.0 km || 
|-id=456 bgcolor=#fefefe
| 310456 ||  || — || August 26, 2000 || Socorro || LINEAR || H || align=right | 1.0 km || 
|-id=457 bgcolor=#fefefe
| 310457 ||  || — || August 31, 2000 || Socorro || LINEAR || H || align=right data-sort-value="0.97" | 970 m || 
|-id=458 bgcolor=#FA8072
| 310458 ||  || — || August 28, 2000 || Socorro || LINEAR || — || align=right | 1.9 km || 
|-id=459 bgcolor=#fefefe
| 310459 ||  || — || August 31, 2000 || Socorro || LINEAR || NYS || align=right data-sort-value="0.78" | 780 m || 
|-id=460 bgcolor=#fefefe
| 310460 ||  || — || August 31, 2000 || Socorro || LINEAR || — || align=right | 1.3 km || 
|-id=461 bgcolor=#fefefe
| 310461 ||  || — || August 31, 2000 || Socorro || LINEAR || — || align=right | 1.3 km || 
|-id=462 bgcolor=#fefefe
| 310462 ||  || — || August 20, 2000 || Kitt Peak || Spacewatch || FLO || align=right data-sort-value="0.74" | 740 m || 
|-id=463 bgcolor=#d6d6d6
| 310463 ||  || — || September 3, 2000 || Socorro || LINEAR || — || align=right | 4.5 km || 
|-id=464 bgcolor=#FA8072
| 310464 ||  || — || September 18, 2000 || Socorro || LINEAR || PHO || align=right | 2.5 km || 
|-id=465 bgcolor=#d6d6d6
| 310465 ||  || — || September 23, 2000 || Socorro || LINEAR || — || align=right | 5.7 km || 
|-id=466 bgcolor=#fefefe
| 310466 ||  || — || September 20, 2000 || Socorro || LINEAR || — || align=right | 1.0 km || 
|-id=467 bgcolor=#fefefe
| 310467 ||  || — || September 24, 2000 || Socorro || LINEAR || — || align=right | 1.6 km || 
|-id=468 bgcolor=#fefefe
| 310468 ||  || — || September 23, 2000 || Socorro || LINEAR || FLO || align=right data-sort-value="0.80" | 800 m || 
|-id=469 bgcolor=#fefefe
| 310469 ||  || — || September 24, 2000 || Socorro || LINEAR || NYS || align=right data-sort-value="0.72" | 720 m || 
|-id=470 bgcolor=#fefefe
| 310470 ||  || — || September 24, 2000 || Socorro || LINEAR || — || align=right | 1.3 km || 
|-id=471 bgcolor=#fefefe
| 310471 ||  || — || September 24, 2000 || Socorro || LINEAR || — || align=right | 1.0 km || 
|-id=472 bgcolor=#fefefe
| 310472 ||  || — || September 25, 2000 || Socorro || LINEAR || V || align=right data-sort-value="0.84" | 840 m || 
|-id=473 bgcolor=#fefefe
| 310473 ||  || — || September 23, 2000 || Socorro || LINEAR || — || align=right | 1.9 km || 
|-id=474 bgcolor=#fefefe
| 310474 ||  || — || September 23, 2000 || Socorro || LINEAR || — || align=right | 1.1 km || 
|-id=475 bgcolor=#fefefe
| 310475 ||  || — || September 23, 2000 || Socorro || LINEAR || V || align=right | 1.0 km || 
|-id=476 bgcolor=#fefefe
| 310476 ||  || — || September 23, 2000 || Socorro || LINEAR || FLO || align=right data-sort-value="0.83" | 830 m || 
|-id=477 bgcolor=#fefefe
| 310477 ||  || — || September 25, 2000 || Socorro || LINEAR || — || align=right | 1.2 km || 
|-id=478 bgcolor=#fefefe
| 310478 ||  || — || September 24, 2000 || Socorro || LINEAR || — || align=right | 1.2 km || 
|-id=479 bgcolor=#fefefe
| 310479 ||  || — || September 24, 2000 || Socorro || LINEAR || — || align=right data-sort-value="0.88" | 880 m || 
|-id=480 bgcolor=#fefefe
| 310480 ||  || — || September 24, 2000 || Socorro || LINEAR || — || align=right | 1.0 km || 
|-id=481 bgcolor=#fefefe
| 310481 ||  || — || September 21, 2000 || Anderson Mesa || LONEOS || — || align=right | 1.2 km || 
|-id=482 bgcolor=#fefefe
| 310482 ||  || — || September 26, 2000 || Socorro || LINEAR || H || align=right | 1.1 km || 
|-id=483 bgcolor=#fefefe
| 310483 ||  || — || September 27, 2000 || Socorro || LINEAR || FLO || align=right data-sort-value="0.87" | 870 m || 
|-id=484 bgcolor=#fefefe
| 310484 ||  || — || September 28, 2000 || Socorro || LINEAR || NYS || align=right data-sort-value="0.92" | 920 m || 
|-id=485 bgcolor=#fefefe
| 310485 ||  || — || September 22, 2000 || Haleakala || NEAT || FLO || align=right data-sort-value="0.89" | 890 m || 
|-id=486 bgcolor=#fefefe
| 310486 ||  || — || September 23, 2000 || Anderson Mesa || LONEOS || PHO || align=right | 1.3 km || 
|-id=487 bgcolor=#fefefe
| 310487 ||  || — || September 23, 2000 || Anderson Mesa || LONEOS || NYS || align=right data-sort-value="0.80" | 800 m || 
|-id=488 bgcolor=#fefefe
| 310488 ||  || — || October 3, 2000 || Kitt Peak || Spacewatch || NYS || align=right data-sort-value="0.88" | 880 m || 
|-id=489 bgcolor=#d6d6d6
| 310489 ||  || — || October 2, 2000 || Anderson Mesa || LONEOS || TEL || align=right | 1.8 km || 
|-id=490 bgcolor=#fefefe
| 310490 ||  || — || October 19, 2000 || Kitt Peak || Spacewatch || NYS || align=right data-sort-value="0.76" | 760 m || 
|-id=491 bgcolor=#fefefe
| 310491 ||  || — || October 25, 2000 || Socorro || LINEAR || — || align=right | 1.1 km || 
|-id=492 bgcolor=#fefefe
| 310492 ||  || — || October 24, 2000 || Socorro || LINEAR || — || align=right | 1.4 km || 
|-id=493 bgcolor=#fefefe
| 310493 ||  || — || October 29, 2000 || Kitt Peak || Spacewatch || — || align=right | 1.1 km || 
|-id=494 bgcolor=#fefefe
| 310494 ||  || — || October 24, 2000 || Socorro || LINEAR || FLO || align=right data-sort-value="0.84" | 840 m || 
|-id=495 bgcolor=#fefefe
| 310495 ||  || — || October 24, 2000 || Socorro || LINEAR || ERI || align=right | 1.6 km || 
|-id=496 bgcolor=#fefefe
| 310496 ||  || — || October 25, 2000 || Socorro || LINEAR || NYS || align=right data-sort-value="0.74" | 740 m || 
|-id=497 bgcolor=#fefefe
| 310497 ||  || — || October 30, 2000 || Socorro || LINEAR || FLO || align=right | 1.00 km || 
|-id=498 bgcolor=#fefefe
| 310498 ||  || — || October 25, 2000 || Socorro || LINEAR || V || align=right data-sort-value="0.95" | 950 m || 
|-id=499 bgcolor=#fefefe
| 310499 ||  || — || October 25, 2000 || Socorro || LINEAR || — || align=right | 1.2 km || 
|-id=500 bgcolor=#fefefe
| 310500 ||  || — || November 1, 2000 || Socorro || LINEAR || — || align=right | 1.3 km || 
|}

310501–310600 

|-bgcolor=#d6d6d6
| 310501 ||  || — || November 3, 2000 || Socorro || LINEAR || TIR || align=right | 4.6 km || 
|-id=502 bgcolor=#d6d6d6
| 310502 ||  || — || November 20, 2000 || Socorro || LINEAR || — || align=right | 3.0 km || 
|-id=503 bgcolor=#fefefe
| 310503 ||  || — || November 21, 2000 || Socorro || LINEAR || — || align=right data-sort-value="0.99" | 990 m || 
|-id=504 bgcolor=#fefefe
| 310504 ||  || — || November 21, 2000 || Socorro || LINEAR || FLO || align=right data-sort-value="0.90" | 900 m || 
|-id=505 bgcolor=#d6d6d6
| 310505 ||  || — || November 21, 2000 || Socorro || LINEAR || — || align=right | 2.9 km || 
|-id=506 bgcolor=#fefefe
| 310506 ||  || — || November 25, 2000 || Kitt Peak || Spacewatch || MAS || align=right data-sort-value="0.73" | 730 m || 
|-id=507 bgcolor=#fefefe
| 310507 ||  || — || November 21, 2000 || Socorro || LINEAR || — || align=right | 1.5 km || 
|-id=508 bgcolor=#fefefe
| 310508 ||  || — || November 20, 2000 || Socorro || LINEAR || V || align=right data-sort-value="0.95" | 950 m || 
|-id=509 bgcolor=#d6d6d6
| 310509 ||  || — || November 26, 2000 || Socorro || LINEAR || — || align=right | 3.7 km || 
|-id=510 bgcolor=#d6d6d6
| 310510 ||  || — || November 20, 2000 || Socorro || LINEAR || — || align=right | 3.3 km || 
|-id=511 bgcolor=#fefefe
| 310511 ||  || — || November 29, 2000 || Haleakala || NEAT || — || align=right | 1.2 km || 
|-id=512 bgcolor=#d6d6d6
| 310512 ||  || — || November 29, 2000 || Kitt Peak || Spacewatch || TIR || align=right | 3.4 km || 
|-id=513 bgcolor=#fefefe
| 310513 ||  || — || November 26, 2000 || Socorro || LINEAR || — || align=right | 1.3 km || 
|-id=514 bgcolor=#d6d6d6
| 310514 ||  || — || December 5, 2000 || Bohyunsan || Y.-B. Jeon, B.-C. Lee || TIR || align=right | 4.2 km || 
|-id=515 bgcolor=#fefefe
| 310515 ||  || — || December 4, 2000 || Socorro || LINEAR || — || align=right data-sort-value="0.95" | 950 m || 
|-id=516 bgcolor=#d6d6d6
| 310516 ||  || — || December 4, 2000 || Socorro || LINEAR || MEL || align=right | 5.3 km || 
|-id=517 bgcolor=#d6d6d6
| 310517 ||  || — || December 4, 2000 || Socorro || LINEAR || — || align=right | 7.7 km || 
|-id=518 bgcolor=#fefefe
| 310518 ||  || — || December 21, 2000 || Kitt Peak || Spacewatch || NYS || align=right data-sort-value="0.83" | 830 m || 
|-id=519 bgcolor=#fefefe
| 310519 ||  || — || December 30, 2000 || Socorro || LINEAR || H || align=right | 1.2 km || 
|-id=520 bgcolor=#d6d6d6
| 310520 ||  || — || December 30, 2000 || Socorro || LINEAR || — || align=right | 4.5 km || 
|-id=521 bgcolor=#fefefe
| 310521 ||  || — || December 30, 2000 || Socorro || LINEAR || — || align=right | 1.2 km || 
|-id=522 bgcolor=#FA8072
| 310522 ||  || — || December 30, 2000 || Socorro || LINEAR || — || align=right | 1.5 km || 
|-id=523 bgcolor=#d6d6d6
| 310523 ||  || — || December 30, 2000 || Socorro || LINEAR || EUP || align=right | 7.2 km || 
|-id=524 bgcolor=#d6d6d6
| 310524 ||  || — || December 29, 2000 || Kitt Peak || Spacewatch || — || align=right | 4.4 km || 
|-id=525 bgcolor=#d6d6d6
| 310525 ||  || — || December 29, 2000 || Haleakala || NEAT || TIR || align=right | 4.8 km || 
|-id=526 bgcolor=#fefefe
| 310526 ||  || — || December 31, 2000 || Kitt Peak || Spacewatch || — || align=right data-sort-value="0.94" | 940 m || 
|-id=527 bgcolor=#fefefe
| 310527 ||  || — || January 2, 2001 || Socorro || LINEAR || — || align=right | 1.5 km || 
|-id=528 bgcolor=#fefefe
| 310528 ||  || — || January 2, 2001 || Socorro || LINEAR || MAS || align=right data-sort-value="0.99" | 990 m || 
|-id=529 bgcolor=#d6d6d6
| 310529 ||  || — || January 19, 2001 || Socorro || LINEAR || — || align=right | 3.5 km || 
|-id=530 bgcolor=#d6d6d6
| 310530 ||  || — || January 19, 2001 || Socorro || LINEAR || TIR || align=right | 4.8 km || 
|-id=531 bgcolor=#fefefe
| 310531 ||  || — || January 16, 2001 || Haleakala || NEAT || — || align=right | 1.2 km || 
|-id=532 bgcolor=#d6d6d6
| 310532 ||  || — || January 19, 2001 || Socorro || LINEAR || TIR || align=right | 5.8 km || 
|-id=533 bgcolor=#fefefe
| 310533 ||  || — || January 20, 2001 || Socorro || LINEAR || PHO || align=right | 1.7 km || 
|-id=534 bgcolor=#d6d6d6
| 310534 ||  || — || January 20, 2001 || Socorro || LINEAR || Tj (2.9) || align=right | 4.6 km || 
|-id=535 bgcolor=#FA8072
| 310535 ||  || — || January 19, 2001 || Socorro || LINEAR || — || align=right data-sort-value="0.94" | 940 m || 
|-id=536 bgcolor=#d6d6d6
| 310536 ||  || — || January 27, 2001 || Ondřejov || P. Kušnirák || — || align=right | 4.1 km || 
|-id=537 bgcolor=#d6d6d6
| 310537 ||  || — || January 17, 2001 || Kitt Peak || Spacewatch || — || align=right | 4.0 km || 
|-id=538 bgcolor=#fefefe
| 310538 ||  || — || January 18, 2001 || Socorro || LINEAR || — || align=right data-sort-value="0.90" | 900 m || 
|-id=539 bgcolor=#d6d6d6
| 310539 ||  || — || February 1, 2001 || Anderson Mesa || LONEOS || EUP || align=right | 6.2 km || 
|-id=540 bgcolor=#d6d6d6
| 310540 ||  || — || February 2, 2001 || Anderson Mesa || LONEOS || EUP || align=right | 6.2 km || 
|-id=541 bgcolor=#d6d6d6
| 310541 ||  || — || February 16, 2001 || Socorro || LINEAR || Tj (2.97) || align=right | 6.2 km || 
|-id=542 bgcolor=#fefefe
| 310542 ||  || — || February 17, 2001 || Socorro || LINEAR || NYS || align=right | 1.0 km || 
|-id=543 bgcolor=#fefefe
| 310543 ||  || — || February 17, 2001 || Socorro || LINEAR || — || align=right | 1.1 km || 
|-id=544 bgcolor=#d6d6d6
| 310544 ||  || — || February 19, 2001 || Socorro || LINEAR || — || align=right | 4.0 km || 
|-id=545 bgcolor=#fefefe
| 310545 ||  || — || February 17, 2001 || Socorro || LINEAR || NYS || align=right data-sort-value="0.91" | 910 m || 
|-id=546 bgcolor=#d6d6d6
| 310546 ||  || — || February 21, 2001 || Kitt Peak || Spacewatch || EUP || align=right | 5.0 km || 
|-id=547 bgcolor=#d6d6d6
| 310547 ||  || — || March 2, 2001 || Anderson Mesa || LONEOS || — || align=right | 4.5 km || 
|-id=548 bgcolor=#fefefe
| 310548 ||  || — || March 2, 2001 || Anderson Mesa || LONEOS || — || align=right | 1.0 km || 
|-id=549 bgcolor=#d6d6d6
| 310549 ||  || — || March 14, 2001 || Socorro || LINEAR || EUP || align=right | 4.4 km || 
|-id=550 bgcolor=#d6d6d6
| 310550 ||  || — || March 24, 2001 || Haleakala || NEAT || — || align=right | 4.2 km || 
|-id=551 bgcolor=#d6d6d6
| 310551 ||  || — || March 20, 2001 || Anderson Mesa || LONEOS || TIR || align=right | 4.7 km || 
|-id=552 bgcolor=#E9E9E9
| 310552 ||  || — || July 22, 2001 || Palomar || NEAT || — || align=right | 3.2 km || 
|-id=553 bgcolor=#E9E9E9
| 310553 ||  || — || July 22, 2001 || Palomar || NEAT || CLO || align=right | 2.5 km || 
|-id=554 bgcolor=#E9E9E9
| 310554 ||  || — || August 10, 2001 || Palomar || NEAT || — || align=right | 2.4 km || 
|-id=555 bgcolor=#E9E9E9
| 310555 ||  || — || August 10, 2001 || Palomar || NEAT || — || align=right | 2.9 km || 
|-id=556 bgcolor=#E9E9E9
| 310556 ||  || — || August 11, 2001 || Palomar || NEAT || — || align=right | 2.9 km || 
|-id=557 bgcolor=#E9E9E9
| 310557 ||  || — || August 11, 2001 || Palomar || NEAT || — || align=right | 3.6 km || 
|-id=558 bgcolor=#E9E9E9
| 310558 ||  || — || August 12, 2001 || Palomar || NEAT || CLO || align=right | 2.1 km || 
|-id=559 bgcolor=#E9E9E9
| 310559 ||  || — || August 20, 2001 || Socorro || LINEAR || DOR || align=right | 2.8 km || 
|-id=560 bgcolor=#FFC2E0
| 310560 ||  || — || August 24, 2001 || Anderson Mesa || LONEOS || APO +1kmPHAmooncritical || align=right | 1.0 km || 
|-id=561 bgcolor=#E9E9E9
| 310561 ||  || — || August 24, 2001 || Anderson Mesa || LONEOS || — || align=right | 2.2 km || 
|-id=562 bgcolor=#E9E9E9
| 310562 ||  || — || September 10, 2001 || Socorro || LINEAR || GEF || align=right | 1.5 km || 
|-id=563 bgcolor=#E9E9E9
| 310563 ||  || — || September 12, 2001 || Socorro || LINEAR || — || align=right | 2.7 km || 
|-id=564 bgcolor=#fefefe
| 310564 ||  || — || September 12, 2001 || Socorro || LINEAR || — || align=right data-sort-value="0.82" | 820 m || 
|-id=565 bgcolor=#fefefe
| 310565 ||  || — || September 12, 2001 || Socorro || LINEAR || — || align=right data-sort-value="0.85" | 850 m || 
|-id=566 bgcolor=#E9E9E9
| 310566 ||  || — || September 16, 2001 || Socorro || LINEAR || — || align=right | 2.6 km || 
|-id=567 bgcolor=#d6d6d6
| 310567 ||  || — || September 17, 2001 || Socorro || LINEAR || — || align=right | 3.0 km || 
|-id=568 bgcolor=#E9E9E9
| 310568 ||  || — || September 19, 2001 || Socorro || LINEAR || — || align=right | 2.6 km || 
|-id=569 bgcolor=#E9E9E9
| 310569 ||  || — || September 20, 2001 || Socorro || LINEAR || — || align=right | 2.3 km || 
|-id=570 bgcolor=#E9E9E9
| 310570 ||  || — || September 16, 2001 || Socorro || LINEAR || — || align=right | 3.2 km || 
|-id=571 bgcolor=#E9E9E9
| 310571 ||  || — || September 16, 2001 || Socorro || LINEAR || — || align=right | 2.7 km || 
|-id=572 bgcolor=#E9E9E9
| 310572 ||  || — || September 19, 2001 || Socorro || LINEAR || MRX || align=right | 1.1 km || 
|-id=573 bgcolor=#fefefe
| 310573 ||  || — || September 19, 2001 || Socorro || LINEAR || — || align=right data-sort-value="0.87" | 870 m || 
|-id=574 bgcolor=#FA8072
| 310574 ||  || — || September 19, 2001 || Socorro || LINEAR || unusual || align=right | 2.3 km || 
|-id=575 bgcolor=#E9E9E9
| 310575 ||  || — || September 19, 2001 || Socorro || LINEAR || AGN || align=right | 1.5 km || 
|-id=576 bgcolor=#E9E9E9
| 310576 ||  || — || September 21, 2001 || Palomar || NEAT || — || align=right | 2.9 km || 
|-id=577 bgcolor=#fefefe
| 310577 ||  || — || October 14, 2001 || Socorro || LINEAR || H || align=right data-sort-value="0.83" | 830 m || 
|-id=578 bgcolor=#d6d6d6
| 310578 ||  || — || October 14, 2001 || Socorro || LINEAR || — || align=right | 4.3 km || 
|-id=579 bgcolor=#fefefe
| 310579 ||  || — || October 14, 2001 || Socorro || LINEAR || FLO || align=right data-sort-value="0.72" | 720 m || 
|-id=580 bgcolor=#E9E9E9
| 310580 ||  || — || October 13, 2001 || Palomar || NEAT || — || align=right | 3.4 km || 
|-id=581 bgcolor=#E9E9E9
| 310581 ||  || — || October 11, 2001 || Socorro || LINEAR || GEF || align=right | 1.7 km || 
|-id=582 bgcolor=#FA8072
| 310582 ||  || — || October 15, 2001 || Palomar || NEAT || — || align=right data-sort-value="0.87" | 870 m || 
|-id=583 bgcolor=#E9E9E9
| 310583 ||  || — || October 10, 2001 || Palomar || NEAT || — || align=right | 2.8 km || 
|-id=584 bgcolor=#E9E9E9
| 310584 ||  || — || October 10, 2001 || Palomar || NEAT || HOF || align=right | 3.3 km || 
|-id=585 bgcolor=#fefefe
| 310585 ||  || — || October 18, 2001 || Palomar || NEAT || — || align=right | 2.8 km || 
|-id=586 bgcolor=#fefefe
| 310586 ||  || — || October 17, 2001 || Socorro || LINEAR || — || align=right data-sort-value="0.81" | 810 m || 
|-id=587 bgcolor=#fefefe
| 310587 ||  || — || October 20, 2001 || Socorro || LINEAR || — || align=right | 1.0 km || 
|-id=588 bgcolor=#fefefe
| 310588 ||  || — || October 22, 2001 || Socorro || LINEAR || — || align=right data-sort-value="0.97" | 970 m || 
|-id=589 bgcolor=#E9E9E9
| 310589 ||  || — || October 17, 2001 || Palomar || NEAT || — || align=right | 2.4 km || 
|-id=590 bgcolor=#fefefe
| 310590 ||  || — || October 21, 2001 || Socorro || LINEAR || FLO || align=right data-sort-value="0.69" | 690 m || 
|-id=591 bgcolor=#E9E9E9
| 310591 ||  || — || October 16, 2001 || Palomar || NEAT || MRX || align=right | 1.4 km || 
|-id=592 bgcolor=#d6d6d6
| 310592 ||  || — || November 10, 2001 || Socorro || LINEAR || — || align=right | 2.7 km || 
|-id=593 bgcolor=#d6d6d6
| 310593 ||  || — || November 10, 2001 || Socorro || LINEAR || BRA || align=right | 1.9 km || 
|-id=594 bgcolor=#d6d6d6
| 310594 ||  || — || November 10, 2001 || Socorro || LINEAR || — || align=right | 4.5 km || 
|-id=595 bgcolor=#d6d6d6
| 310595 ||  || — || November 12, 2001 || Socorro || LINEAR || — || align=right | 2.6 km || 
|-id=596 bgcolor=#fefefe
| 310596 ||  || — || November 16, 2001 || Kitt Peak || Spacewatch || — || align=right data-sort-value="0.89" | 890 m || 
|-id=597 bgcolor=#d6d6d6
| 310597 ||  || — || November 18, 2001 || Bisei SG Center || BATTeRS || YAK || align=right | 3.0 km || 
|-id=598 bgcolor=#d6d6d6
| 310598 ||  || — || November 17, 2001 || Socorro || LINEAR || — || align=right | 2.5 km || 
|-id=599 bgcolor=#E9E9E9
| 310599 ||  || — || November 19, 2001 || Socorro || LINEAR || — || align=right | 2.7 km || 
|-id=600 bgcolor=#E9E9E9
| 310600 ||  || — || November 20, 2001 || Socorro || LINEAR || AGN || align=right | 1.3 km || 
|}

310601–310700 

|-bgcolor=#fefefe
| 310601 ||  || — || December 9, 2001 || Socorro || LINEAR || H || align=right | 1.0 km || 
|-id=602 bgcolor=#fefefe
| 310602 ||  || — || December 9, 2001 || Socorro || LINEAR || FLO || align=right data-sort-value="0.90" | 900 m || 
|-id=603 bgcolor=#d6d6d6
| 310603 ||  || — || December 9, 2001 || Socorro || LINEAR || — || align=right | 4.0 km || 
|-id=604 bgcolor=#fefefe
| 310604 ||  || — || December 14, 2001 || Socorro || LINEAR || FLO || align=right data-sort-value="0.85" | 850 m || 
|-id=605 bgcolor=#fefefe
| 310605 ||  || — || December 14, 2001 || Socorro || LINEAR || — || align=right | 1.0 km || 
|-id=606 bgcolor=#fefefe
| 310606 ||  || — || December 14, 2001 || Socorro || LINEAR || — || align=right data-sort-value="0.85" | 850 m || 
|-id=607 bgcolor=#fefefe
| 310607 ||  || — || December 14, 2001 || Socorro || LINEAR || FLO || align=right data-sort-value="0.87" | 870 m || 
|-id=608 bgcolor=#fefefe
| 310608 ||  || — || December 15, 2001 || Socorro || LINEAR || — || align=right | 1.2 km || 
|-id=609 bgcolor=#d6d6d6
| 310609 ||  || — || December 15, 2001 || Socorro || LINEAR || CHA || align=right | 2.9 km || 
|-id=610 bgcolor=#d6d6d6
| 310610 ||  || — || December 15, 2001 || Socorro || LINEAR || — || align=right | 3.2 km || 
|-id=611 bgcolor=#fefefe
| 310611 ||  || — || December 18, 2001 || Socorro || LINEAR || — || align=right | 1.2 km || 
|-id=612 bgcolor=#fefefe
| 310612 ||  || — || December 18, 2001 || Socorro || LINEAR || FLO || align=right data-sort-value="0.76" | 760 m || 
|-id=613 bgcolor=#fefefe
| 310613 ||  || — || December 17, 2001 || Socorro || LINEAR || — || align=right data-sort-value="0.91" | 910 m || 
|-id=614 bgcolor=#d6d6d6
| 310614 ||  || — || December 20, 2001 || Palomar || NEAT || — || align=right | 4.3 km || 
|-id=615 bgcolor=#fefefe
| 310615 ||  || — || December 18, 2001 || Apache Point || SDSS || FLO || align=right data-sort-value="0.56" | 560 m || 
|-id=616 bgcolor=#FA8072
| 310616 ||  || — || January 5, 2002 || Kitt Peak || Spacewatch || — || align=right data-sort-value="0.79" | 790 m || 
|-id=617 bgcolor=#d6d6d6
| 310617 ||  || — || January 8, 2002 || Kitt Peak || Spacewatch || — || align=right | 3.7 km || 
|-id=618 bgcolor=#E9E9E9
| 310618 ||  || — || January 9, 2002 || Socorro || LINEAR || — || align=right | 3.2 km || 
|-id=619 bgcolor=#fefefe
| 310619 ||  || — || January 9, 2002 || Socorro || LINEAR || — || align=right | 1.1 km || 
|-id=620 bgcolor=#d6d6d6
| 310620 ||  || — || January 8, 2002 || Socorro || LINEAR || — || align=right | 2.7 km || 
|-id=621 bgcolor=#d6d6d6
| 310621 ||  || — || January 8, 2002 || Socorro || LINEAR || — || align=right | 3.0 km || 
|-id=622 bgcolor=#d6d6d6
| 310622 ||  || — || January 9, 2002 || Socorro || LINEAR || — || align=right | 2.9 km || 
|-id=623 bgcolor=#FA8072
| 310623 ||  || — || January 14, 2002 || Socorro || LINEAR || H || align=right data-sort-value="0.83" | 830 m || 
|-id=624 bgcolor=#d6d6d6
| 310624 ||  || — || January 9, 2002 || Socorro || LINEAR || — || align=right | 3.0 km || 
|-id=625 bgcolor=#d6d6d6
| 310625 ||  || — || January 13, 2002 || Socorro || LINEAR || EOS || align=right | 2.3 km || 
|-id=626 bgcolor=#fefefe
| 310626 ||  || — || January 14, 2002 || Socorro || LINEAR || — || align=right data-sort-value="0.92" | 920 m || 
|-id=627 bgcolor=#d6d6d6
| 310627 ||  || — || January 14, 2002 || Socorro || LINEAR || — || align=right | 4.7 km || 
|-id=628 bgcolor=#d6d6d6
| 310628 ||  || — || January 8, 2002 || Kitt Peak || Spacewatch || ALA || align=right | 3.3 km || 
|-id=629 bgcolor=#fefefe
| 310629 ||  || — || January 13, 2002 || Kitt Peak || Spacewatch || — || align=right data-sort-value="0.75" | 750 m || 
|-id=630 bgcolor=#d6d6d6
| 310630 ||  || — || January 21, 2002 || Socorro || LINEAR || — || align=right | 4.7 km || 
|-id=631 bgcolor=#fefefe
| 310631 ||  || — || February 5, 2002 || Palomar || NEAT || — || align=right data-sort-value="0.98" | 980 m || 
|-id=632 bgcolor=#d6d6d6
| 310632 ||  || — || February 6, 2002 || Socorro || LINEAR || — || align=right | 3.8 km || 
|-id=633 bgcolor=#fefefe
| 310633 ||  || — || January 19, 2002 || Socorro || LINEAR || FLO || align=right data-sort-value="0.78" | 780 m || 
|-id=634 bgcolor=#fefefe
| 310634 ||  || — || February 6, 2002 || Socorro || LINEAR || FLO || align=right data-sort-value="0.95" | 950 m || 
|-id=635 bgcolor=#fefefe
| 310635 ||  || — || February 8, 2002 || Socorro || LINEAR || — || align=right | 1.1 km || 
|-id=636 bgcolor=#fefefe
| 310636 ||  || — || February 8, 2002 || Socorro || LINEAR || — || align=right data-sort-value="0.90" | 900 m || 
|-id=637 bgcolor=#fefefe
| 310637 ||  || — || February 8, 2002 || Socorro || LINEAR || FLO || align=right data-sort-value="0.93" | 930 m || 
|-id=638 bgcolor=#d6d6d6
| 310638 ||  || — || February 8, 2002 || Socorro || LINEAR || — || align=right | 4.8 km || 
|-id=639 bgcolor=#fefefe
| 310639 ||  || — || February 8, 2002 || Socorro || LINEAR || — || align=right data-sort-value="0.85" | 850 m || 
|-id=640 bgcolor=#fefefe
| 310640 ||  || — || February 10, 2002 || Socorro || LINEAR || NYS || align=right data-sort-value="0.63" | 630 m || 
|-id=641 bgcolor=#C2FFFF
| 310641 ||  || — || February 10, 2002 || Socorro || LINEAR || L4 || align=right | 13 km || 
|-id=642 bgcolor=#fefefe
| 310642 ||  || — || February 10, 2002 || Socorro || LINEAR || FLO || align=right | 1.0 km || 
|-id=643 bgcolor=#d6d6d6
| 310643 ||  || — || February 11, 2002 || Socorro || LINEAR || EOS || align=right | 2.4 km || 
|-id=644 bgcolor=#fefefe
| 310644 ||  || — || February 8, 2002 || Kitt Peak || Spacewatch || FLO || align=right data-sort-value="0.63" | 630 m || 
|-id=645 bgcolor=#C2FFFF
| 310645 ||  || — || February 10, 2002 || Kitt Peak || Spacewatch || L4 || align=right | 9.1 km || 
|-id=646 bgcolor=#fefefe
| 310646 ||  || — || February 13, 2002 || Socorro || LINEAR || — || align=right | 1.2 km || 
|-id=647 bgcolor=#fefefe
| 310647 ||  || — || February 8, 2002 || Kitt Peak || M. W. Buie || — || align=right data-sort-value="0.91" | 910 m || 
|-id=648 bgcolor=#fefefe
| 310648 ||  || — || February 9, 2002 || Kitt Peak || Spacewatch || — || align=right | 1.1 km || 
|-id=649 bgcolor=#d6d6d6
| 310649 ||  || — || February 10, 2002 || Socorro || LINEAR || — || align=right | 2.2 km || 
|-id=650 bgcolor=#fefefe
| 310650 ||  || — || February 7, 2002 || Haleakala || NEAT || V || align=right data-sort-value="0.80" | 800 m || 
|-id=651 bgcolor=#d6d6d6
| 310651 ||  || — || February 10, 2002 || Socorro || LINEAR || — || align=right | 2.8 km || 
|-id=652 bgcolor=#d6d6d6
| 310652 Hansjörgdittus ||  ||  || January 10, 2002 || Cima Ekar || ADAS || — || align=right | 3.2 km || 
|-id=653 bgcolor=#fefefe
| 310653 ||  || — || February 18, 2002 || Cima Ekar || ADAS || NYS || align=right data-sort-value="0.77" | 770 m || 
|-id=654 bgcolor=#d6d6d6
| 310654 ||  || — || February 16, 2002 || Palomar || NEAT || — || align=right | 3.2 km || 
|-id=655 bgcolor=#C2FFFF
| 310655 ||  || — || October 17, 2010 || Mount Lemmon || Mount Lemmon Survey || L4 || align=right | 8.6 km || 
|-id=656 bgcolor=#d6d6d6
| 310656 ||  || — || March 6, 2002 || Palomar || NEAT || — || align=right | 5.0 km || 
|-id=657 bgcolor=#d6d6d6
| 310657 ||  || — || March 10, 2002 || Cima Ekar || ADAS || — || align=right | 2.5 km || 
|-id=658 bgcolor=#fefefe
| 310658 ||  || — || March 12, 2002 || Socorro || LINEAR || — || align=right data-sort-value="0.94" | 940 m || 
|-id=659 bgcolor=#fefefe
| 310659 ||  || — || March 13, 2002 || Socorro || LINEAR || — || align=right data-sort-value="0.98" | 980 m || 
|-id=660 bgcolor=#d6d6d6
| 310660 ||  || — || March 13, 2002 || Socorro || LINEAR || — || align=right | 3.1 km || 
|-id=661 bgcolor=#fefefe
| 310661 ||  || — || March 12, 2002 || Socorro || LINEAR || — || align=right | 1.0 km || 
|-id=662 bgcolor=#fefefe
| 310662 ||  || — || March 9, 2002 || Kitt Peak || Spacewatch || — || align=right | 1.0 km || 
|-id=663 bgcolor=#fefefe
| 310663 ||  || — || March 9, 2002 || Anderson Mesa || LONEOS || FLO || align=right data-sort-value="0.93" | 930 m || 
|-id=664 bgcolor=#fefefe
| 310664 ||  || — || March 9, 2002 || Anderson Mesa || LONEOS || — || align=right data-sort-value="0.91" | 910 m || 
|-id=665 bgcolor=#fefefe
| 310665 ||  || — || March 10, 2002 || Anderson Mesa || LONEOS || NYS || align=right data-sort-value="0.76" | 760 m || 
|-id=666 bgcolor=#C2FFFF
| 310666 ||  || — || March 12, 2002 || Palomar || NEAT || L4 || align=right | 14 km || 
|-id=667 bgcolor=#fefefe
| 310667 ||  || — || March 14, 2002 || Palomar || NEAT || — || align=right data-sort-value="0.87" | 870 m || 
|-id=668 bgcolor=#C2FFFF
| 310668 ||  || — || March 12, 2002 || Palomar || NEAT || L4ARK || align=right | 11 km || 
|-id=669 bgcolor=#fefefe
| 310669 ||  || — || March 11, 2002 || Palomar || NEAT || — || align=right data-sort-value="0.83" | 830 m || 
|-id=670 bgcolor=#C2FFFF
| 310670 ||  || — || March 10, 2002 || Haleakala || NEAT || L4 || align=right | 12 km || 
|-id=671 bgcolor=#fefefe
| 310671 ||  || — || March 21, 2002 || Socorro || LINEAR || H || align=right data-sort-value="0.88" | 880 m || 
|-id=672 bgcolor=#fefefe
| 310672 ||  || — || March 21, 2002 || Socorro || LINEAR || PHO || align=right | 3.1 km || 
|-id=673 bgcolor=#fefefe
| 310673 ||  || — || March 16, 2002 || Socorro || LINEAR || — || align=right data-sort-value="0.85" | 850 m || 
|-id=674 bgcolor=#fefefe
| 310674 ||  || — || March 20, 2002 || Socorro || LINEAR || MAS || align=right data-sort-value="0.88" | 880 m || 
|-id=675 bgcolor=#fefefe
| 310675 ||  || — || March 20, 2002 || Kitt Peak || M. W. Buie || EUT || align=right data-sort-value="0.72" | 720 m || 
|-id=676 bgcolor=#d6d6d6
| 310676 ||  || — || March 20, 2002 || Anderson Mesa || LONEOS || — || align=right | 5.3 km || 
|-id=677 bgcolor=#fefefe
| 310677 ||  || — || March 16, 2002 || Kvistaberg || UDAS || FLO || align=right data-sort-value="0.76" | 760 m || 
|-id=678 bgcolor=#d6d6d6
| 310678 ||  || — || April 10, 2002 || Palomar || NEAT || — || align=right | 3.8 km || 
|-id=679 bgcolor=#fefefe
| 310679 ||  || — || April 10, 2002 || Socorro || LINEAR || H || align=right data-sort-value="0.91" | 910 m || 
|-id=680 bgcolor=#d6d6d6
| 310680 ||  || — || April 12, 2002 || Desert Eagle || W. K. Y. Yeung || — || align=right | 4.6 km || 
|-id=681 bgcolor=#d6d6d6
| 310681 ||  || — || April 15, 2002 || Palomar || NEAT || — || align=right | 4.1 km || 
|-id=682 bgcolor=#fefefe
| 310682 ||  || — || April 2, 2002 || Palomar || NEAT || — || align=right data-sort-value="0.96" | 960 m || 
|-id=683 bgcolor=#fefefe
| 310683 ||  || — || April 5, 2002 || Anderson Mesa || LONEOS || — || align=right data-sort-value="0.87" | 870 m || 
|-id=684 bgcolor=#d6d6d6
| 310684 ||  || — || April 10, 2002 || Socorro || LINEAR || — || align=right | 4.0 km || 
|-id=685 bgcolor=#d6d6d6
| 310685 ||  || — || April 10, 2002 || Socorro || LINEAR || — || align=right | 4.3 km || 
|-id=686 bgcolor=#d6d6d6
| 310686 ||  || — || April 11, 2002 || Anderson Mesa || LONEOS || — || align=right | 4.1 km || 
|-id=687 bgcolor=#d6d6d6
| 310687 ||  || — || April 9, 2002 || Kvistaberg || UDAS || — || align=right | 4.1 km || 
|-id=688 bgcolor=#fefefe
| 310688 ||  || — || April 10, 2002 || Socorro || LINEAR || — || align=right data-sort-value="0.86" | 860 m || 
|-id=689 bgcolor=#fefefe
| 310689 ||  || — || April 11, 2002 || Socorro || LINEAR || — || align=right data-sort-value="0.94" | 940 m || 
|-id=690 bgcolor=#d6d6d6
| 310690 ||  || — || April 12, 2002 || Socorro || LINEAR || — || align=right | 4.1 km || 
|-id=691 bgcolor=#fefefe
| 310691 ||  || — || April 13, 2002 || Palomar || NEAT || — || align=right data-sort-value="0.90" | 900 m || 
|-id=692 bgcolor=#fefefe
| 310692 ||  || — || April 13, 2002 || Palomar || NEAT || V || align=right data-sort-value="0.89" | 890 m || 
|-id=693 bgcolor=#d6d6d6
| 310693 ||  || — || April 14, 2002 || Palomar || NEAT || — || align=right | 2.9 km || 
|-id=694 bgcolor=#fefefe
| 310694 ||  || — || April 10, 2002 || Socorro || LINEAR || — || align=right | 1.1 km || 
|-id=695 bgcolor=#fefefe
| 310695 ||  || — || April 11, 2002 || Socorro || LINEAR || FLO || align=right | 1.1 km || 
|-id=696 bgcolor=#fefefe
| 310696 ||  || — || April 9, 2002 || Palomar || NEAT || NYS || align=right data-sort-value="0.69" | 690 m || 
|-id=697 bgcolor=#d6d6d6
| 310697 ||  || — || April 22, 2002 || Socorro || LINEAR || EUP || align=right | 6.7 km || 
|-id=698 bgcolor=#d6d6d6
| 310698 ||  || — || May 5, 2002 || Socorro || LINEAR || EUP || align=right | 5.1 km || 
|-id=699 bgcolor=#fefefe
| 310699 ||  || — || May 5, 2002 || Socorro || LINEAR || — || align=right | 1.6 km || 
|-id=700 bgcolor=#d6d6d6
| 310700 ||  || — || May 6, 2002 || Socorro || LINEAR || EUP || align=right | 4.9 km || 
|}

310701–310800 

|-bgcolor=#d6d6d6
| 310701 ||  || — || May 9, 2002 || Anderson Mesa || LONEOS || — || align=right | 5.0 km || 
|-id=702 bgcolor=#d6d6d6
| 310702 ||  || — || May 8, 2002 || Socorro || LINEAR || — || align=right | 3.8 km || 
|-id=703 bgcolor=#d6d6d6
| 310703 ||  || — || May 3, 2002 || Palomar || NEAT || — || align=right | 4.6 km || 
|-id=704 bgcolor=#d6d6d6
| 310704 ||  || — || May 4, 2002 || Anderson Mesa || LONEOS || EUP || align=right | 8.3 km || 
|-id=705 bgcolor=#d6d6d6
| 310705 ||  || — || May 5, 2002 || Anderson Mesa || LONEOS || — || align=right | 5.2 km || 
|-id=706 bgcolor=#d6d6d6
| 310706 ||  || — || May 6, 2002 || Socorro || LINEAR || — || align=right | 5.0 km || 
|-id=707 bgcolor=#d6d6d6
| 310707 ||  || — || June 6, 2002 || Socorro || LINEAR || — || align=right | 5.7 km || 
|-id=708 bgcolor=#E9E9E9
| 310708 ||  || — || June 12, 2002 || Palomar || NEAT || — || align=right | 1.2 km || 
|-id=709 bgcolor=#fefefe
| 310709 ||  || — || August 29, 2006 || Catalina || CSS || V || align=right data-sort-value="0.67" | 670 m || 
|-id=710 bgcolor=#E9E9E9
| 310710 ||  || — || January 13, 2005 || Kitt Peak || Spacewatch || — || align=right | 1.3 km || 
|-id=711 bgcolor=#E9E9E9
| 310711 ||  || — || December 18, 2003 || Kitt Peak || Spacewatch || — || align=right | 1.6 km || 
|-id=712 bgcolor=#E9E9E9
| 310712 ||  || — || July 13, 2002 || Socorro || LINEAR || — || align=right | 2.3 km || 
|-id=713 bgcolor=#E9E9E9
| 310713 ||  || — || July 13, 2002 || Socorro || LINEAR || JUN || align=right | 1.5 km || 
|-id=714 bgcolor=#E9E9E9
| 310714 ||  || — || July 14, 2002 || Socorro || LINEAR || — || align=right | 1.2 km || 
|-id=715 bgcolor=#fefefe
| 310715 ||  || — || July 4, 2002 || Palomar || NEAT || V || align=right data-sort-value="0.84" | 840 m || 
|-id=716 bgcolor=#E9E9E9
| 310716 ||  || — || July 12, 2002 || Palomar || NEAT || — || align=right | 1.3 km || 
|-id=717 bgcolor=#d6d6d6
| 310717 ||  || — || July 9, 2002 || Palomar || NEAT || 7:4 || align=right | 3.7 km || 
|-id=718 bgcolor=#E9E9E9
| 310718 ||  || — || July 12, 2002 || Palomar || NEAT || — || align=right | 1.1 km || 
|-id=719 bgcolor=#E9E9E9
| 310719 ||  || — || July 8, 2002 || Palomar || NEAT || — || align=right | 1.3 km || 
|-id=720 bgcolor=#E9E9E9
| 310720 ||  || — || July 12, 2002 || Palomar || NEAT || — || align=right | 1.3 km || 
|-id=721 bgcolor=#E9E9E9
| 310721 ||  || — || July 5, 2002 || Palomar || NEAT || — || align=right | 1.2 km || 
|-id=722 bgcolor=#E9E9E9
| 310722 ||  || — || July 21, 2002 || Palomar || NEAT || — || align=right | 1.4 km || 
|-id=723 bgcolor=#E9E9E9
| 310723 ||  || — || July 18, 2002 || Palomar || NEAT || — || align=right | 1.0 km || 
|-id=724 bgcolor=#E9E9E9
| 310724 ||  || — || July 22, 2002 || Palomar || NEAT || — || align=right | 1.3 km || 
|-id=725 bgcolor=#E9E9E9
| 310725 ||  || — || August 6, 2002 || Palomar || NEAT || — || align=right | 1.7 km || 
|-id=726 bgcolor=#E9E9E9
| 310726 ||  || — || August 6, 2002 || Palomar || NEAT || — || align=right | 1.7 km || 
|-id=727 bgcolor=#E9E9E9
| 310727 ||  || — || August 6, 2002 || Palomar || NEAT || — || align=right | 1.1 km || 
|-id=728 bgcolor=#FA8072
| 310728 ||  || — || August 10, 2002 || Socorro || LINEAR || — || align=right | 2.8 km || 
|-id=729 bgcolor=#E9E9E9
| 310729 ||  || — || August 14, 2002 || Palomar || NEAT || EUN || align=right | 1.9 km || 
|-id=730 bgcolor=#E9E9E9
| 310730 ||  || — || August 14, 2002 || Socorro || LINEAR || — || align=right | 1.5 km || 
|-id=731 bgcolor=#E9E9E9
| 310731 ||  || — || August 12, 2002 || Socorro || LINEAR || — || align=right | 1.6 km || 
|-id=732 bgcolor=#E9E9E9
| 310732 ||  || — || August 15, 2002 || Socorro || LINEAR || MIT || align=right | 3.4 km || 
|-id=733 bgcolor=#E9E9E9
| 310733 ||  || — || August 8, 2002 || Palomar || A. Lowe || — || align=right | 1.7 km || 
|-id=734 bgcolor=#E9E9E9
| 310734 ||  || — || August 9, 2002 || Haleakala || A. Lowe || — || align=right | 1.9 km || 
|-id=735 bgcolor=#E9E9E9
| 310735 ||  || — || August 8, 2002 || Palomar || NEAT || — || align=right | 1.7 km || 
|-id=736 bgcolor=#E9E9E9
| 310736 ||  || — || August 8, 2002 || Palomar || NEAT || — || align=right data-sort-value="0.98" | 980 m || 
|-id=737 bgcolor=#FFC2E0
| 310737 ||  || — || August 29, 2002 || Palomar || NEAT || AMO +1km || align=right data-sort-value="0.98" | 980 m || 
|-id=738 bgcolor=#d6d6d6
| 310738 ||  || — || August 30, 2002 || Palomar || NEAT || SHU3:2 || align=right | 4.8 km || 
|-id=739 bgcolor=#E9E9E9
| 310739 ||  || — || August 30, 2002 || Socorro || LINEAR || — || align=right | 1.7 km || 
|-id=740 bgcolor=#E9E9E9
| 310740 ||  || — || August 29, 2002 || Palomar || S. F. Hönig || — || align=right | 1.0 km || 
|-id=741 bgcolor=#E9E9E9
| 310741 ||  || — || August 29, 2002 || Palomar || S. F. Hönig || ADE || align=right | 2.4 km || 
|-id=742 bgcolor=#E9E9E9
| 310742 ||  || — || August 29, 2002 || Palomar || NEAT || — || align=right data-sort-value="0.94" | 940 m || 
|-id=743 bgcolor=#E9E9E9
| 310743 ||  || — || August 30, 2002 || Palomar || NEAT || — || align=right | 1.7 km || 
|-id=744 bgcolor=#fefefe
| 310744 ||  || — || August 17, 2002 || Palomar || NEAT || — || align=right data-sort-value="0.87" | 870 m || 
|-id=745 bgcolor=#E9E9E9
| 310745 ||  || — || August 18, 2002 || Palomar || NEAT || — || align=right | 1.3 km || 
|-id=746 bgcolor=#fefefe
| 310746 ||  || — || August 29, 2002 || Palomar || NEAT || NYS || align=right data-sort-value="0.99" | 990 m || 
|-id=747 bgcolor=#E9E9E9
| 310747 ||  || — || May 13, 2005 || Kitt Peak || Spacewatch || — || align=right | 1.6 km || 
|-id=748 bgcolor=#E9E9E9
| 310748 ||  || — || November 8, 2007 || Kitt Peak || Spacewatch || — || align=right | 1.3 km || 
|-id=749 bgcolor=#fefefe
| 310749 ||  || — || December 5, 2007 || Kitt Peak || Spacewatch || NYS || align=right | 1.0 km || 
|-id=750 bgcolor=#fefefe
| 310750 ||  || — || September 3, 2002 || Palomar || NEAT || — || align=right | 1.3 km || 
|-id=751 bgcolor=#fefefe
| 310751 ||  || — || September 5, 2002 || Socorro || LINEAR || H || align=right data-sort-value="0.82" | 820 m || 
|-id=752 bgcolor=#E9E9E9
| 310752 ||  || — || September 5, 2002 || Socorro || LINEAR || — || align=right | 1.3 km || 
|-id=753 bgcolor=#E9E9E9
| 310753 ||  || — || September 5, 2002 || Socorro || LINEAR || — || align=right | 2.1 km || 
|-id=754 bgcolor=#E9E9E9
| 310754 ||  || — || September 5, 2002 || Socorro || LINEAR || — || align=right | 1.7 km || 
|-id=755 bgcolor=#E9E9E9
| 310755 ||  || — || September 5, 2002 || Anderson Mesa || LONEOS || — || align=right | 1.6 km || 
|-id=756 bgcolor=#d6d6d6
| 310756 ||  || — || September 4, 2002 || Anderson Mesa || LONEOS || HIL3:2 || align=right | 6.2 km || 
|-id=757 bgcolor=#d6d6d6
| 310757 ||  || — || September 5, 2002 || Socorro || LINEAR || SHU3:2 || align=right | 6.3 km || 
|-id=758 bgcolor=#E9E9E9
| 310758 ||  || — || September 8, 2002 || Haleakala || NEAT || RAF || align=right | 1.2 km || 
|-id=759 bgcolor=#E9E9E9
| 310759 ||  || — || September 9, 2002 || Palomar || NEAT || — || align=right | 1.2 km || 
|-id=760 bgcolor=#E9E9E9
| 310760 ||  || — || September 11, 2002 || Palomar || NEAT || — || align=right | 1.5 km || 
|-id=761 bgcolor=#E9E9E9
| 310761 ||  || — || September 11, 2002 || Palomar || NEAT || — || align=right | 1.5 km || 
|-id=762 bgcolor=#E9E9E9
| 310762 ||  || — || September 12, 2002 || Palomar || NEAT || — || align=right | 1.7 km || 
|-id=763 bgcolor=#E9E9E9
| 310763 ||  || — || September 15, 2002 || Kitt Peak || Spacewatch || — || align=right data-sort-value="0.98" | 980 m || 
|-id=764 bgcolor=#E9E9E9
| 310764 ||  || — || September 13, 2002 || Socorro || LINEAR || RAF || align=right | 1.1 km || 
|-id=765 bgcolor=#E9E9E9
| 310765 ||  || — || September 13, 2002 || Kitt Peak || Spacewatch || — || align=right | 1.5 km || 
|-id=766 bgcolor=#E9E9E9
| 310766 ||  || — || September 13, 2002 || Anderson Mesa || LONEOS || — || align=right | 2.0 km || 
|-id=767 bgcolor=#E9E9E9
| 310767 ||  || — || September 8, 2002 || Haleakala || R. Matson || — || align=right | 1.1 km || 
|-id=768 bgcolor=#E9E9E9
| 310768 ||  || — || September 11, 2002 || Palomar || M. White, M. Collins || — || align=right | 1.1 km || 
|-id=769 bgcolor=#E9E9E9
| 310769 ||  || — || September 15, 2002 || Palomar || NEAT || — || align=right | 1.8 km || 
|-id=770 bgcolor=#d6d6d6
| 310770 ||  || — || September 8, 2002 || Haleakala || NEAT || 3:2 || align=right | 4.4 km || 
|-id=771 bgcolor=#E9E9E9
| 310771 ||  || — || September 14, 2002 || Palomar || NEAT || — || align=right | 1.1 km || 
|-id=772 bgcolor=#E9E9E9
| 310772 ||  || — || September 14, 2002 || Palomar || NEAT || — || align=right | 1.2 km || 
|-id=773 bgcolor=#fefefe
| 310773 ||  || — || September 19, 2006 || Catalina || CSS || — || align=right | 1.1 km || 
|-id=774 bgcolor=#E9E9E9
| 310774 ||  || — || September 27, 2002 || Palomar || NEAT || HNS || align=right | 1.4 km || 
|-id=775 bgcolor=#E9E9E9
| 310775 ||  || — || September 27, 2002 || Palomar || NEAT || — || align=right | 1.6 km || 
|-id=776 bgcolor=#E9E9E9
| 310776 ||  || — || September 28, 2002 || Palomar || NEAT || — || align=right | 1.7 km || 
|-id=777 bgcolor=#FA8072
| 310777 ||  || — || September 27, 2002 || Socorro || LINEAR || — || align=right | 2.2 km || 
|-id=778 bgcolor=#E9E9E9
| 310778 ||  || — || September 28, 2002 || Haleakala || NEAT || — || align=right | 1.5 km || 
|-id=779 bgcolor=#E9E9E9
| 310779 ||  || — || September 28, 2002 || Haleakala || NEAT || — || align=right | 2.1 km || 
|-id=780 bgcolor=#E9E9E9
| 310780 ||  || — || September 29, 2002 || Haleakala || NEAT || — || align=right | 1.2 km || 
|-id=781 bgcolor=#E9E9E9
| 310781 ||  || — || September 29, 2002 || Haleakala || NEAT || — || align=right | 1.7 km || 
|-id=782 bgcolor=#E9E9E9
| 310782 ||  || — || September 29, 2002 || Haleakala || NEAT || — || align=right | 1.5 km || 
|-id=783 bgcolor=#E9E9E9
| 310783 ||  || — || September 30, 2002 || Haleakala || NEAT || EUN || align=right | 1.6 km || 
|-id=784 bgcolor=#E9E9E9
| 310784 ||  || — || September 30, 2002 || Haleakala || NEAT || MAR || align=right | 1.7 km || 
|-id=785 bgcolor=#E9E9E9
| 310785 ||  || — || September 29, 2002 || Haleakala || NEAT || — || align=right | 1.6 km || 
|-id=786 bgcolor=#E9E9E9
| 310786 ||  || — || September 30, 2002 || Socorro || LINEAR || RAF || align=right | 1.3 km || 
|-id=787 bgcolor=#E9E9E9
| 310787 ||  || — || October 2, 2002 || Socorro || LINEAR || — || align=right | 1.9 km || 
|-id=788 bgcolor=#E9E9E9
| 310788 ||  || — || October 4, 2002 || Palomar || NEAT || MAR || align=right | 1.4 km || 
|-id=789 bgcolor=#E9E9E9
| 310789 ||  || — || October 4, 2002 || Palomar || NEAT || ADE || align=right | 2.6 km || 
|-id=790 bgcolor=#E9E9E9
| 310790 ||  || — || October 5, 2002 || Socorro || LINEAR || GER || align=right | 1.6 km || 
|-id=791 bgcolor=#E9E9E9
| 310791 ||  || — || October 5, 2002 || Palomar || NEAT || — || align=right | 1.5 km || 
|-id=792 bgcolor=#E9E9E9
| 310792 ||  || — || October 5, 2002 || Palomar || NEAT || — || align=right | 1.0 km || 
|-id=793 bgcolor=#E9E9E9
| 310793 ||  || — || October 5, 2002 || Palomar || NEAT || JUN || align=right | 1.1 km || 
|-id=794 bgcolor=#E9E9E9
| 310794 ||  || — || October 5, 2002 || Palomar || NEAT || MAR || align=right | 1.6 km || 
|-id=795 bgcolor=#E9E9E9
| 310795 ||  || — || October 3, 2002 || Palomar || NEAT || — || align=right | 2.1 km || 
|-id=796 bgcolor=#E9E9E9
| 310796 ||  || — || October 4, 2002 || Anderson Mesa || LONEOS || JUN || align=right | 1.2 km || 
|-id=797 bgcolor=#E9E9E9
| 310797 ||  || — || October 5, 2002 || Palomar || NEAT || IAN || align=right | 1.0 km || 
|-id=798 bgcolor=#E9E9E9
| 310798 ||  || — || October 4, 2002 || Socorro || LINEAR || — || align=right data-sort-value="0.98" | 980 m || 
|-id=799 bgcolor=#E9E9E9
| 310799 ||  || — || October 5, 2002 || Anderson Mesa || LONEOS || EUN || align=right | 1.4 km || 
|-id=800 bgcolor=#E9E9E9
| 310800 ||  || — || October 4, 2002 || Socorro || LINEAR || — || align=right | 1.6 km || 
|}

310801–310900 

|-bgcolor=#E9E9E9
| 310801 ||  || — || October 6, 2002 || Socorro || LINEAR || — || align=right | 1.7 km || 
|-id=802 bgcolor=#E9E9E9
| 310802 ||  || — || October 6, 2002 || Socorro || LINEAR || JUN || align=right | 1.3 km || 
|-id=803 bgcolor=#E9E9E9
| 310803 ||  || — || October 6, 2002 || Socorro || LINEAR || — || align=right | 2.3 km || 
|-id=804 bgcolor=#E9E9E9
| 310804 ||  || — || October 7, 2002 || Socorro || LINEAR || — || align=right | 1.4 km || 
|-id=805 bgcolor=#E9E9E9
| 310805 ||  || — || October 9, 2002 || Socorro || LINEAR || — || align=right | 1.9 km || 
|-id=806 bgcolor=#E9E9E9
| 310806 ||  || — || October 10, 2002 || Apache Point || SDSS || — || align=right | 1.3 km || 
|-id=807 bgcolor=#E9E9E9
| 310807 ||  || — || October 3, 2002 || Palomar || NEAT || ADE || align=right | 2.6 km || 
|-id=808 bgcolor=#E9E9E9
| 310808 ||  || — || October 13, 2002 || Kitt Peak || Spacewatch || — || align=right | 1.6 km || 
|-id=809 bgcolor=#E9E9E9
| 310809 ||  || — || October 28, 2002 || Kvistaberg || UDAS || — || align=right | 1.5 km || 
|-id=810 bgcolor=#E9E9E9
| 310810 ||  || — || October 30, 2002 || Kitt Peak || Spacewatch || — || align=right | 1.5 km || 
|-id=811 bgcolor=#E9E9E9
| 310811 ||  || — || October 30, 2002 || Palomar || NEAT || MIS || align=right | 2.7 km || 
|-id=812 bgcolor=#E9E9E9
| 310812 ||  || — || October 30, 2002 || Apache Point || SDSS || — || align=right | 1.2 km || 
|-id=813 bgcolor=#E9E9E9
| 310813 ||  || — || October 30, 2002 || Apache Point || SDSS || — || align=right | 1.6 km || 
|-id=814 bgcolor=#E9E9E9
| 310814 ||  || — || October 18, 2002 || Palomar || NEAT || — || align=right | 1.6 km || 
|-id=815 bgcolor=#E9E9E9
| 310815 ||  || — || November 7, 2007 || Mount Lemmon || Mount Lemmon Survey || — || align=right | 1.5 km || 
|-id=816 bgcolor=#E9E9E9
| 310816 ||  || — || November 5, 2002 || Socorro || LINEAR || — || align=right | 2.0 km || 
|-id=817 bgcolor=#E9E9E9
| 310817 ||  || — || November 5, 2002 || Socorro || LINEAR || — || align=right | 2.2 km || 
|-id=818 bgcolor=#E9E9E9
| 310818 ||  || — || November 5, 2002 || Socorro || LINEAR || RAF || align=right | 1.2 km || 
|-id=819 bgcolor=#E9E9E9
| 310819 ||  || — || November 11, 2002 || Palomar || NEAT || — || align=right | 2.3 km || 
|-id=820 bgcolor=#E9E9E9
| 310820 ||  || — || November 7, 2002 || Socorro || LINEAR || — || align=right | 2.4 km || 
|-id=821 bgcolor=#E9E9E9
| 310821 ||  || — || November 7, 2002 || Socorro || LINEAR || — || align=right | 1.6 km || 
|-id=822 bgcolor=#E9E9E9
| 310822 ||  || — || November 7, 2002 || Socorro || LINEAR || — || align=right | 2.6 km || 
|-id=823 bgcolor=#E9E9E9
| 310823 ||  || — || November 12, 2002 || Socorro || LINEAR || JUN || align=right | 1.4 km || 
|-id=824 bgcolor=#E9E9E9
| 310824 ||  || — || November 13, 2002 || Palomar || NEAT || — || align=right | 1.3 km || 
|-id=825 bgcolor=#E9E9E9
| 310825 ||  || — || November 5, 2002 || Palomar || NEAT || — || align=right | 1.6 km || 
|-id=826 bgcolor=#E9E9E9
| 310826 ||  || — || November 24, 2002 || Palomar || NEAT || — || align=right | 1.7 km || 
|-id=827 bgcolor=#E9E9E9
| 310827 ||  || — || November 24, 2002 || Palomar || NEAT || — || align=right | 1.8 km || 
|-id=828 bgcolor=#E9E9E9
| 310828 ||  || — || December 1, 2002 || Socorro || LINEAR || GER || align=right | 1.8 km || 
|-id=829 bgcolor=#E9E9E9
| 310829 ||  || — || December 3, 2002 || Palomar || NEAT || — || align=right | 1.7 km || 
|-id=830 bgcolor=#E9E9E9
| 310830 ||  || — || December 5, 2002 || Socorro || LINEAR || JUN || align=right | 1.4 km || 
|-id=831 bgcolor=#E9E9E9
| 310831 ||  || — || December 5, 2002 || Socorro || LINEAR || MIS || align=right | 2.6 km || 
|-id=832 bgcolor=#E9E9E9
| 310832 ||  || — || December 5, 2002 || Haleakala || NEAT || — || align=right | 2.1 km || 
|-id=833 bgcolor=#E9E9E9
| 310833 ||  || — || December 7, 2002 || Socorro || LINEAR || — || align=right | 3.1 km || 
|-id=834 bgcolor=#E9E9E9
| 310834 ||  || — || December 10, 2002 || Socorro || LINEAR || BAR || align=right | 2.3 km || 
|-id=835 bgcolor=#E9E9E9
| 310835 ||  || — || December 11, 2002 || Desert Moon || B. L. Stevens || PAD || align=right | 1.6 km || 
|-id=836 bgcolor=#E9E9E9
| 310836 ||  || — || December 12, 2002 || Socorro || LINEAR || — || align=right | 2.3 km || 
|-id=837 bgcolor=#E9E9E9
| 310837 ||  || — || December 10, 2002 || Palomar || NEAT || — || align=right | 2.5 km || 
|-id=838 bgcolor=#E9E9E9
| 310838 ||  || — || December 5, 2002 || Socorro || LINEAR || — || align=right | 1.5 km || 
|-id=839 bgcolor=#E9E9E9
| 310839 ||  || — || December 5, 2002 || Socorro || LINEAR || — || align=right | 2.1 km || 
|-id=840 bgcolor=#E9E9E9
| 310840 ||  || — || December 30, 2002 || Haleakala || NEAT || — || align=right | 1.9 km || 
|-id=841 bgcolor=#E9E9E9
| 310841 ||  || — || January 1, 2003 || Socorro || LINEAR || — || align=right | 3.4 km || 
|-id=842 bgcolor=#FFC2E0
| 310842 ||  || — || January 7, 2003 || Socorro || LINEAR || ATE || align=right data-sort-value="0.40" | 400 m || 
|-id=843 bgcolor=#E9E9E9
| 310843 ||  || — || January 5, 2003 || Socorro || LINEAR || JUN || align=right | 1.6 km || 
|-id=844 bgcolor=#E9E9E9
| 310844 ||  || — || January 5, 2003 || Socorro || LINEAR || — || align=right | 2.2 km || 
|-id=845 bgcolor=#E9E9E9
| 310845 ||  || — || January 5, 2003 || Socorro || LINEAR || — || align=right | 2.9 km || 
|-id=846 bgcolor=#E9E9E9
| 310846 ||  || — || January 7, 2003 || Socorro || LINEAR || — || align=right | 2.1 km || 
|-id=847 bgcolor=#E9E9E9
| 310847 ||  || — || January 7, 2003 || Socorro || LINEAR || — || align=right | 3.3 km || 
|-id=848 bgcolor=#E9E9E9
| 310848 ||  || — || January 10, 2003 || Kitt Peak || Spacewatch || — || align=right | 2.5 km || 
|-id=849 bgcolor=#E9E9E9
| 310849 ||  || — || January 5, 2003 || Anderson Mesa || LONEOS || EUN || align=right | 1.8 km || 
|-id=850 bgcolor=#E9E9E9
| 310850 ||  || — || January 24, 2003 || Palomar || NEAT || — || align=right | 3.5 km || 
|-id=851 bgcolor=#E9E9E9
| 310851 ||  || — || January 25, 2003 || Palomar || NEAT || PAL || align=right | 2.4 km || 
|-id=852 bgcolor=#E9E9E9
| 310852 ||  || — || January 25, 2003 || Anderson Mesa || LONEOS || — || align=right | 2.5 km || 
|-id=853 bgcolor=#E9E9E9
| 310853 ||  || — || January 25, 2003 || Palomar || NEAT || — || align=right | 2.7 km || 
|-id=854 bgcolor=#E9E9E9
| 310854 ||  || — || January 28, 2003 || Haleakala || NEAT || IAN || align=right | 1.7 km || 
|-id=855 bgcolor=#E9E9E9
| 310855 ||  || — || January 27, 2003 || Anderson Mesa || LONEOS || — || align=right | 2.1 km || 
|-id=856 bgcolor=#E9E9E9
| 310856 ||  || — || January 27, 2003 || Haleakala || NEAT || ADE || align=right | 3.0 km || 
|-id=857 bgcolor=#E9E9E9
| 310857 ||  || — || January 28, 2003 || Socorro || LINEAR || — || align=right | 2.9 km || 
|-id=858 bgcolor=#E9E9E9
| 310858 ||  || — || January 28, 2003 || Palomar || NEAT || CLO || align=right | 2.7 km || 
|-id=859 bgcolor=#E9E9E9
| 310859 ||  || — || January 31, 2003 || Anderson Mesa || LONEOS || POS || align=right | 4.7 km || 
|-id=860 bgcolor=#E9E9E9
| 310860 ||  || — || February 2, 2003 || Socorro || LINEAR || — || align=right | 2.8 km || 
|-id=861 bgcolor=#E9E9E9
| 310861 ||  || — || February 2, 2003 || Palomar || NEAT || — || align=right | 2.8 km || 
|-id=862 bgcolor=#E9E9E9
| 310862 ||  || — || March 8, 2003 || Palomar || NEAT || — || align=right | 2.7 km || 
|-id=863 bgcolor=#E9E9E9
| 310863 ||  || — || March 20, 2003 || Palomar || NEAT || — || align=right | 3.2 km || 
|-id=864 bgcolor=#d6d6d6
| 310864 ||  || — || March 22, 2003 || Palomar || NEAT || BRA || align=right | 1.7 km || 
|-id=865 bgcolor=#d6d6d6
| 310865 ||  || — || March 24, 2003 || Kitt Peak || Spacewatch || — || align=right | 3.2 km || 
|-id=866 bgcolor=#E9E9E9
| 310866 ||  || — || March 24, 2003 || Kitt Peak || Spacewatch || — || align=right | 2.8 km || 
|-id=867 bgcolor=#C2FFFF
| 310867 ||  || — || April 7, 2003 || Kitt Peak || Spacewatch || L4 || align=right | 8.5 km || 
|-id=868 bgcolor=#E9E9E9
| 310868 ||  || — || April 6, 2003 || Anderson Mesa || LONEOS || — || align=right | 2.9 km || 
|-id=869 bgcolor=#d6d6d6
| 310869 ||  || — || April 7, 2003 || Kitt Peak || Spacewatch || — || align=right | 3.5 km || 
|-id=870 bgcolor=#C2FFFF
| 310870 ||  || — || April 9, 2003 || Palomar || NEAT || L4 || align=right | 10 km || 
|-id=871 bgcolor=#C2FFFF
| 310871 ||  || — || April 11, 2003 || Kitt Peak || Spacewatch || L4 || align=right | 13 km || 
|-id=872 bgcolor=#C2FFFF
| 310872 ||  || — || April 26, 2003 || Kitt Peak || Spacewatch || L4 || align=right | 15 km || 
|-id=873 bgcolor=#d6d6d6
| 310873 ||  || — || April 25, 2003 || Kitt Peak || Spacewatch || — || align=right | 3.7 km || 
|-id=874 bgcolor=#d6d6d6
| 310874 ||  || — || April 26, 2003 || Kitt Peak || Spacewatch || THM || align=right | 2.4 km || 
|-id=875 bgcolor=#fefefe
| 310875 ||  || — || May 2, 2003 || Socorro || LINEAR || FLO || align=right data-sort-value="0.97" | 970 m || 
|-id=876 bgcolor=#d6d6d6
| 310876 ||  || — || May 27, 2003 || Kitt Peak || Spacewatch || fast || align=right | 3.2 km || 
|-id=877 bgcolor=#E9E9E9
| 310877 ||  || — || June 25, 2003 || Palomar || NEAT || — || align=right | 3.2 km || 
|-id=878 bgcolor=#d6d6d6
| 310878 ||  || — || June 28, 2003 || Socorro || LINEAR || EUP || align=right | 5.7 km || 
|-id=879 bgcolor=#FA8072
| 310879 ||  || — || July 26, 2003 || Socorro || LINEAR || PHO || align=right | 1.5 km || 
|-id=880 bgcolor=#fefefe
| 310880 ||  || — || July 29, 2003 || Reedy Creek || J. Broughton || — || align=right | 1.1 km || 
|-id=881 bgcolor=#fefefe
| 310881 ||  || — || August 1, 2003 || Socorro || LINEAR || — || align=right | 1.3 km || 
|-id=882 bgcolor=#fefefe
| 310882 ||  || — || August 1, 2003 || Socorro || LINEAR || — || align=right | 1.4 km || 
|-id=883 bgcolor=#fefefe
| 310883 ||  || — || August 1, 2003 || Socorro || LINEAR || — || align=right | 1.5 km || 
|-id=884 bgcolor=#fefefe
| 310884 ||  || — || August 18, 2003 || Haleakala || NEAT || NYS || align=right data-sort-value="0.97" | 970 m || 
|-id=885 bgcolor=#fefefe
| 310885 ||  || — || August 20, 2003 || Palomar || NEAT || V || align=right data-sort-value="0.92" | 920 m || 
|-id=886 bgcolor=#fefefe
| 310886 ||  || — || August 21, 2003 || Campo Imperatore || CINEOS || V || align=right data-sort-value="0.83" | 830 m || 
|-id=887 bgcolor=#fefefe
| 310887 ||  || — || August 22, 2003 || Palomar || NEAT || NYS || align=right data-sort-value="0.93" | 930 m || 
|-id=888 bgcolor=#fefefe
| 310888 ||  || — || August 23, 2003 || Socorro || LINEAR || — || align=right | 1.0 km || 
|-id=889 bgcolor=#fefefe
| 310889 ||  || — || August 22, 2003 || Palomar || NEAT || — || align=right | 1.3 km || 
|-id=890 bgcolor=#fefefe
| 310890 ||  || — || August 23, 2003 || Palomar || NEAT || MAS || align=right data-sort-value="0.88" | 880 m || 
|-id=891 bgcolor=#fefefe
| 310891 ||  || — || August 26, 2003 || Socorro || LINEAR || V || align=right data-sort-value="0.79" | 790 m || 
|-id=892 bgcolor=#fefefe
| 310892 ||  || — || August 31, 2003 || Socorro || LINEAR || — || align=right | 1.4 km || 
|-id=893 bgcolor=#fefefe
| 310893 ||  || — || August 22, 2003 || Palomar || NEAT || — || align=right data-sort-value="0.85" | 850 m || 
|-id=894 bgcolor=#fefefe
| 310894 ||  || — || September 1, 2003 || Socorro || LINEAR || MAS || align=right data-sort-value="0.95" | 950 m || 
|-id=895 bgcolor=#fefefe
| 310895 ||  || — || September 4, 2003 || Campo Imperatore || CINEOS || — || align=right | 1.1 km || 
|-id=896 bgcolor=#fefefe
| 310896 ||  || — || September 4, 2003 || Socorro || LINEAR || — || align=right | 1.2 km || 
|-id=897 bgcolor=#fefefe
| 310897 ||  || — || September 15, 2003 || Anderson Mesa || LONEOS || NYS || align=right data-sort-value="0.73" | 730 m || 
|-id=898 bgcolor=#fefefe
| 310898 ||  || — || September 17, 2003 || Socorro || LINEAR || H || align=right data-sort-value="0.87" | 870 m || 
|-id=899 bgcolor=#fefefe
| 310899 ||  || — || September 16, 2003 || Kitt Peak || Spacewatch || SUL || align=right | 2.3 km || 
|-id=900 bgcolor=#fefefe
| 310900 ||  || — || September 17, 2003 || Kitt Peak || Spacewatch || MAS || align=right | 1.1 km || 
|}

310901–311000 

|-bgcolor=#fefefe
| 310901 ||  || — || September 16, 2003 || Kitt Peak || Spacewatch || — || align=right data-sort-value="0.92" | 920 m || 
|-id=902 bgcolor=#fefefe
| 310902 ||  || — || September 17, 2003 || Haleakala || NEAT || — || align=right | 1.0 km || 
|-id=903 bgcolor=#fefefe
| 310903 ||  || — || September 18, 2003 || Palomar || NEAT || V || align=right data-sort-value="0.87" | 870 m || 
|-id=904 bgcolor=#fefefe
| 310904 ||  || — || September 16, 2003 || Palomar || NEAT || H || align=right | 1.1 km || 
|-id=905 bgcolor=#fefefe
| 310905 ||  || — || September 16, 2003 || Anderson Mesa || LONEOS || — || align=right | 1.3 km || 
|-id=906 bgcolor=#fefefe
| 310906 ||  || — || September 16, 2003 || Anderson Mesa || LONEOS || MAS || align=right | 1.0 km || 
|-id=907 bgcolor=#fefefe
| 310907 ||  || — || September 16, 2003 || Anderson Mesa || LONEOS || ERI || align=right | 2.2 km || 
|-id=908 bgcolor=#fefefe
| 310908 ||  || — || September 18, 2003 || Palomar || NEAT || — || align=right | 1.0 km || 
|-id=909 bgcolor=#d6d6d6
| 310909 ||  || — || September 17, 2003 || Anderson Mesa || LONEOS || — || align=right | 5.4 km || 
|-id=910 bgcolor=#fefefe
| 310910 ||  || — || September 18, 2003 || Campo Imperatore || CINEOS || — || align=right data-sort-value="0.92" | 920 m || 
|-id=911 bgcolor=#fefefe
| 310911 ||  || — || September 17, 2003 || Kitt Peak || Spacewatch || — || align=right | 1.5 km || 
|-id=912 bgcolor=#fefefe
| 310912 ||  || — || September 19, 2003 || Kitt Peak || Spacewatch || MAS || align=right data-sort-value="0.86" | 860 m || 
|-id=913 bgcolor=#fefefe
| 310913 ||  || — || August 31, 2003 || Kitt Peak || Spacewatch || — || align=right | 1.00 km || 
|-id=914 bgcolor=#E9E9E9
| 310914 ||  || — || September 16, 2003 || Palomar || NEAT || EUN || align=right | 1.2 km || 
|-id=915 bgcolor=#fefefe
| 310915 ||  || — || September 18, 2003 || Palomar || NEAT || — || align=right | 1.1 km || 
|-id=916 bgcolor=#fefefe
| 310916 ||  || — || September 19, 2003 || Kitt Peak || Spacewatch || MAS || align=right data-sort-value="0.60" | 600 m || 
|-id=917 bgcolor=#fefefe
| 310917 ||  || — || September 20, 2003 || Palomar || NEAT || — || align=right | 1.5 km || 
|-id=918 bgcolor=#E9E9E9
| 310918 ||  || — || September 20, 2003 || Palomar || NEAT || — || align=right | 1.5 km || 
|-id=919 bgcolor=#d6d6d6
| 310919 ||  || — || September 20, 2003 || Kitt Peak || Spacewatch || TIR || align=right | 5.2 km || 
|-id=920 bgcolor=#fefefe
| 310920 ||  || — || September 18, 2003 || Goodricke-Pigott || R. A. Tucker || — || align=right | 1.1 km || 
|-id=921 bgcolor=#fefefe
| 310921 ||  || — || September 19, 2003 || Kitt Peak || Spacewatch || MAS || align=right | 1.0 km || 
|-id=922 bgcolor=#fefefe
| 310922 ||  || — || September 20, 2003 || Palomar || NEAT || — || align=right | 1.6 km || 
|-id=923 bgcolor=#fefefe
| 310923 ||  || — || September 17, 2003 || Socorro || LINEAR || — || align=right | 1.5 km || 
|-id=924 bgcolor=#fefefe
| 310924 ||  || — || September 22, 2003 || Socorro || LINEAR || — || align=right | 1.4 km || 
|-id=925 bgcolor=#fefefe
| 310925 ||  || — || September 18, 2003 || Palomar || NEAT || — || align=right | 1.2 km || 
|-id=926 bgcolor=#fefefe
| 310926 ||  || — || September 19, 2003 || Palomar || NEAT || SUL || align=right | 2.7 km || 
|-id=927 bgcolor=#fefefe
| 310927 ||  || — || September 26, 2003 || Socorro || LINEAR || MAS || align=right data-sort-value="0.91" | 910 m || 
|-id=928 bgcolor=#d6d6d6
| 310928 ||  || — || September 26, 2003 || Socorro || LINEAR || SYL7:4 || align=right | 5.3 km || 
|-id=929 bgcolor=#fefefe
| 310929 ||  || — || September 27, 2003 || Kitt Peak || Spacewatch || MAS || align=right data-sort-value="0.57" | 570 m || 
|-id=930 bgcolor=#fefefe
| 310930 ||  || — || September 27, 2003 || Kitt Peak || Spacewatch || — || align=right | 1.1 km || 
|-id=931 bgcolor=#fefefe
| 310931 ||  || — || September 29, 2003 || Kitt Peak || Spacewatch || MAS || align=right data-sort-value="0.98" | 980 m || 
|-id=932 bgcolor=#fefefe
| 310932 ||  || — || September 29, 2003 || Socorro || LINEAR || — || align=right | 1.0 km || 
|-id=933 bgcolor=#fefefe
| 310933 ||  || — || September 21, 2003 || Palomar || NEAT || — || align=right | 1.2 km || 
|-id=934 bgcolor=#fefefe
| 310934 ||  || — || September 29, 2003 || Anderson Mesa || LONEOS || — || align=right | 1.2 km || 
|-id=935 bgcolor=#fefefe
| 310935 ||  || — || September 27, 2003 || Kitt Peak || Spacewatch || MAScritical || align=right data-sort-value="0.78" | 780 m || 
|-id=936 bgcolor=#d6d6d6
| 310936 ||  || — || September 20, 2003 || Kitt Peak || Spacewatch || HIL3:2 || align=right | 5.6 km || 
|-id=937 bgcolor=#fefefe
| 310937 ||  || — || September 26, 2003 || Apache Point || SDSS || — || align=right data-sort-value="0.90" | 900 m || 
|-id=938 bgcolor=#fefefe
| 310938 ||  || — || September 28, 2003 || Anderson Mesa || LONEOS || NYS || align=right data-sort-value="0.70" | 700 m || 
|-id=939 bgcolor=#fefefe
| 310939 ||  || — || September 21, 2003 || Kitt Peak || Spacewatch || — || align=right data-sort-value="0.69" | 690 m || 
|-id=940 bgcolor=#fefefe
| 310940 ||  || — || September 26, 2003 || Apache Point || SDSS || FLO || align=right data-sort-value="0.73" | 730 m || 
|-id=941 bgcolor=#fefefe
| 310941 ||  || — || September 26, 2003 || Apache Point || SDSS || NYS || align=right data-sort-value="0.84" | 840 m || 
|-id=942 bgcolor=#fefefe
| 310942 ||  || — || September 26, 2003 || Apache Point || SDSS || V || align=right data-sort-value="0.81" | 810 m || 
|-id=943 bgcolor=#fefefe
| 310943 ||  || — || October 15, 2003 || Socorro || LINEAR || H || align=right data-sort-value="0.89" | 890 m || 
|-id=944 bgcolor=#fefefe
| 310944 ||  || — || October 14, 2003 || Anderson Mesa || LONEOS || NYS || align=right data-sort-value="0.96" | 960 m || 
|-id=945 bgcolor=#fefefe
| 310945 ||  || — || October 15, 2003 || Anderson Mesa || LONEOS || — || align=right | 1.3 km || 
|-id=946 bgcolor=#fefefe
| 310946 ||  || — || October 1, 2003 || Kitt Peak || Spacewatch || NYS || align=right data-sort-value="0.93" | 930 m || 
|-id=947 bgcolor=#fefefe
| 310947 ||  || — || October 16, 2003 || Kitt Peak || Spacewatch || — || align=right data-sort-value="0.82" | 820 m || 
|-id=948 bgcolor=#fefefe
| 310948 ||  || — || October 16, 2003 || Anderson Mesa || LONEOS || — || align=right | 1.2 km || 
|-id=949 bgcolor=#fefefe
| 310949 ||  || — || October 16, 2003 || Kitt Peak || Spacewatch || NYS || align=right data-sort-value="0.86" | 860 m || 
|-id=950 bgcolor=#fefefe
| 310950 ||  || — || October 25, 2003 || Goodricke-Pigott || R. A. Tucker || — || align=right | 1.0 km || 
|-id=951 bgcolor=#fefefe
| 310951 ||  || — || October 26, 2003 || Kleť || Kleť Obs. || — || align=right | 1.0 km || 
|-id=952 bgcolor=#fefefe
| 310952 ||  || — || October 18, 2003 || Palomar || NEAT || — || align=right | 1.0 km || 
|-id=953 bgcolor=#fefefe
| 310953 ||  || — || October 18, 2003 || Palomar || NEAT || V || align=right | 1.1 km || 
|-id=954 bgcolor=#fefefe
| 310954 ||  || — || October 18, 2003 || Palomar || NEAT || — || align=right | 1.2 km || 
|-id=955 bgcolor=#fefefe
| 310955 ||  || — || October 19, 2003 || Goodricke-Pigott || R. A. Tucker || NYS || align=right data-sort-value="0.91" | 910 m || 
|-id=956 bgcolor=#fefefe
| 310956 ||  || — || October 17, 2003 || Anderson Mesa || LONEOS || SUL || align=right | 2.4 km || 
|-id=957 bgcolor=#fefefe
| 310957 ||  || — || October 18, 2003 || Kitt Peak || Spacewatch || — || align=right data-sort-value="0.76" | 760 m || 
|-id=958 bgcolor=#fefefe
| 310958 ||  || — || October 19, 2003 || Kitt Peak || Spacewatch || NYS || align=right data-sort-value="0.87" | 870 m || 
|-id=959 bgcolor=#fefefe
| 310959 ||  || — || October 19, 2003 || Anderson Mesa || LONEOS || — || align=right data-sort-value="0.94" | 940 m || 
|-id=960 bgcolor=#fefefe
| 310960 ||  || — || October 19, 2003 || Palomar || NEAT || — || align=right | 1.5 km || 
|-id=961 bgcolor=#fefefe
| 310961 ||  || — || October 19, 2003 || Kitt Peak || Spacewatch || — || align=right data-sort-value="0.90" | 900 m || 
|-id=962 bgcolor=#fefefe
| 310962 ||  || — || October 21, 2003 || Socorro || LINEAR || NYS || align=right data-sort-value="0.88" | 880 m || 
|-id=963 bgcolor=#fefefe
| 310963 ||  || — || October 18, 2003 || Kitt Peak || Spacewatch || NYS || align=right data-sort-value="0.82" | 820 m || 
|-id=964 bgcolor=#fefefe
| 310964 ||  || — || October 18, 2003 || Kitt Peak || Spacewatch || — || align=right | 1.0 km || 
|-id=965 bgcolor=#fefefe
| 310965 ||  || — || October 20, 2003 || Palomar || NEAT || V || align=right data-sort-value="0.98" | 980 m || 
|-id=966 bgcolor=#E9E9E9
| 310966 ||  || — || October 19, 2003 || Palomar || NEAT || KON || align=right | 3.4 km || 
|-id=967 bgcolor=#fefefe
| 310967 ||  || — || October 16, 2003 || Palomar || NEAT || — || align=right | 1.0 km || 
|-id=968 bgcolor=#fefefe
| 310968 ||  || — || October 18, 2003 || Anderson Mesa || LONEOS || — || align=right | 1.2 km || 
|-id=969 bgcolor=#fefefe
| 310969 ||  || — || October 21, 2003 || Kitt Peak || Spacewatch || NYS || align=right data-sort-value="0.78" | 780 m || 
|-id=970 bgcolor=#fefefe
| 310970 ||  || — || October 21, 2003 || Socorro || LINEAR || — || align=right | 1.1 km || 
|-id=971 bgcolor=#fefefe
| 310971 ||  || — || October 21, 2003 || Kitt Peak || Spacewatch || NYS || align=right data-sort-value="0.88" | 880 m || 
|-id=972 bgcolor=#fefefe
| 310972 ||  || — || October 21, 2003 || Socorro || LINEAR || NYS || align=right | 1.1 km || 
|-id=973 bgcolor=#fefefe
| 310973 ||  || — || October 23, 2003 || Kitt Peak || Spacewatch || NYS || align=right data-sort-value="0.78" | 780 m || 
|-id=974 bgcolor=#fefefe
| 310974 ||  || — || October 24, 2003 || Socorro || LINEAR || — || align=right data-sort-value="0.85" | 850 m || 
|-id=975 bgcolor=#fefefe
| 310975 ||  || — || October 24, 2003 || Socorro || LINEAR || — || align=right data-sort-value="0.85" | 850 m || 
|-id=976 bgcolor=#fefefe
| 310976 ||  || — || October 27, 2003 || Bergisch Gladbach || W. Bickel || — || align=right data-sort-value="0.83" | 830 m || 
|-id=977 bgcolor=#fefefe
| 310977 ||  || — || October 29, 2003 || Socorro || LINEAR || V || align=right data-sort-value="0.94" | 940 m || 
|-id=978 bgcolor=#fefefe
| 310978 ||  || — || October 25, 2003 || Socorro || LINEAR || V || align=right | 1.0 km || 
|-id=979 bgcolor=#fefefe
| 310979 ||  || — || October 16, 2003 || Kitt Peak || Spacewatch || CLA || align=right | 1.8 km || 
|-id=980 bgcolor=#fefefe
| 310980 ||  || — || October 18, 2003 || Kitt Peak || Spacewatch || — || align=right data-sort-value="0.93" | 930 m || 
|-id=981 bgcolor=#fefefe
| 310981 ||  || — || October 17, 2003 || Apache Point || SDSS || — || align=right data-sort-value="0.99" | 990 m || 
|-id=982 bgcolor=#fefefe
| 310982 ||  || — || October 18, 2003 || Apache Point || SDSS || — || align=right | 1.0 km || 
|-id=983 bgcolor=#d6d6d6
| 310983 ||  || — || September 20, 2003 || Kitt Peak || Spacewatch || 7:4 || align=right | 5.8 km || 
|-id=984 bgcolor=#fefefe
| 310984 ||  || — || October 19, 2003 || Apache Point || SDSS || NYS || align=right data-sort-value="0.69" | 690 m || 
|-id=985 bgcolor=#fefefe
| 310985 ||  || — || November 9, 1993 || Kitt Peak || Spacewatch || — || align=right | 1.1 km || 
|-id=986 bgcolor=#fefefe
| 310986 ||  || — || October 22, 2003 || Apache Point || SDSS || — || align=right data-sort-value="0.80" | 800 m || 
|-id=987 bgcolor=#fefefe
| 310987 ||  || — || November 18, 2003 || Kitt Peak || Spacewatch || — || align=right | 1.1 km || 
|-id=988 bgcolor=#fefefe
| 310988 ||  || — || November 19, 2003 || Kitt Peak || Spacewatch || V || align=right data-sort-value="0.89" | 890 m || 
|-id=989 bgcolor=#E9E9E9
| 310989 ||  || — || November 20, 2003 || Socorro || LINEAR || — || align=right | 1.0 km || 
|-id=990 bgcolor=#E9E9E9
| 310990 ||  || — || November 18, 2003 || Palomar || NEAT || — || align=right | 1.7 km || 
|-id=991 bgcolor=#FA8072
| 310991 ||  || — || November 19, 2003 || Socorro || LINEAR || — || align=right | 1.2 km || 
|-id=992 bgcolor=#fefefe
| 310992 ||  || — || November 16, 2003 || Kitt Peak || Spacewatch || NYS || align=right data-sort-value="0.96" | 960 m || 
|-id=993 bgcolor=#fefefe
| 310993 ||  || — || November 18, 2003 || Palomar || NEAT || — || align=right | 1.2 km || 
|-id=994 bgcolor=#d6d6d6
| 310994 ||  || — || November 20, 2003 || Socorro || LINEAR || SHU3:2 || align=right | 5.7 km || 
|-id=995 bgcolor=#E9E9E9
| 310995 ||  || — || November 20, 2003 || Socorro || LINEAR || — || align=right | 1.2 km || 
|-id=996 bgcolor=#fefefe
| 310996 ||  || — || November 21, 2003 || Palomar || NEAT || — || align=right | 1.2 km || 
|-id=997 bgcolor=#FA8072
| 310997 ||  || — || November 21, 2003 || Socorro || LINEAR || H || align=right | 1.0 km || 
|-id=998 bgcolor=#fefefe
| 310998 ||  || — || November 21, 2003 || Socorro || LINEAR || V || align=right data-sort-value="0.88" | 880 m || 
|-id=999 bgcolor=#d6d6d6
| 310999 ||  || — || November 24, 2003 || Anderson Mesa || LONEOS || TIR || align=right | 4.9 km || 
|-id=000 bgcolor=#fefefe
| 311000 ||  || — || November 30, 2003 || Socorro || LINEAR || H || align=right data-sort-value="0.78" | 780 m || 
|}

References

External links 
 Discovery Circumstances: Numbered Minor Planets (310001)–(315000) (IAU Minor Planet Center)

0310